= Wyoming (disambiguation) =

Wyoming is a state in the mountain west region of the United States of America.

Wyoming may also refer to:

== Places ==
=== Australia ===
- Wyoming, New South Wales, a suburb of the Central Coast region

=== Canada ===
- Wyoming, Ontario, Canada, a former village
- Wyoming craton, a geological formation in Canada and the United States

=== United States ===
- Wyoming Territory, a territory which became the state in 1890
- Wyoming, Delaware, a town
- Wyoming, Keweenaw County, Michigan, an unincorporated community
- Wyoming, Illinois, a city
- Wyoming, Iowa, a city
- Wyoming, Michigan, a city
- Wyoming, Minnesota, a city
- Wyoming, Nebraska, an unincorporated community
- Wyoming, New York, a village
- Wyoming County, New York
- Wyoming Correctional Facility, a state men's prison in Attica, Wyoming County, New York
- Wyoming, Ohio, a city
- Wyoming, Pennsylvania, a borough
- Wyoming County, Pennsylvania
- Wyoming Valley, Pennsylvania
- Wyoming, Rhode Island, a village and census-designated place
- Wyoming, West Virginia, an unincorporated community
- Wyoming City, West Virginia, also known as Wyoming, an unincorporated community
- Wyoming County, West Virginia
- Wyoming, Iowa County, Wisconsin, a town
- Wyoming, Waupaca County, Wisconsin, a town
- Wyoming (community), Wisconsin, an unincorporated community
- Wyoming Range, a mountain range in Wyoming
  - Wyoming Peak, a mountain in the Wyoming Range
- Wyoming Township (disambiguation)
- Wyoming craton, a geological formation in Canada and the United States

== Buildings ==
- Wyoming, Birchgrove, New South Wales, Australia, a heritage-listed residence
- Wyoming Cottage, Wyoming, New South Wales, a heritage-listed residence
- Wyoming (Studley, Virginia), United States, a house on the National Register of Historic Places
- Wyoming (Clinton, Maryland), United States, a house on the National Register of Historic Places

== Arts and entertainment ==
=== Fictional characters ===
- Wyoming "Wyoh" Knott, in Robert A. Heinlein's novel The Moon Is a Harsh Mistress
- Wyoming, a character in the machinima series Red vs. Blue

=== Films ===
- Wyoming (1928 film), a Western directed by W. S. Van Dyke
- Wyoming (1940 film), a Western starring Wallace Beery
- Wyoming (1947 film), a Western directed by Joseph Kane

=== Music ===
- "Wyoming" (song), the state song of Wyoming
- Wyoming, a 2013 album by Water Liars

== Schools ==
- University of Wyoming, Laramie, Wyoming
- Wyoming High School (Michigan), Wyoming, Michigan
- Wyoming High School (Ohio), Wyoming, Ohio
- Wyoming Seminary, a Methodist college preparatory school in Wyoming Valley, Pennsylvania

== Ships ==
- Wyoming (schooner), the world's largest wooden schooner
- USS Wyoming, several ships
- Wyoming-class battleship, a US Navy class of two dreadnought battleships commissioned in 1912

== Other uses ==
- Battle of Wyoming (1778), in the American Revolution
- Wyoming Station (disambiguation), various railroad and subway stations in the United States and Canada
- El Gran Wyoming, stage name of Spanish television presenter, actor and humorist Monzón Navarro (born 1955)
