= List of ships named ARA Moreno =

At least two ships of the Argentine Navy have been named ARA Moreno or ARA Mariano Moreno:

- ARA Mariano Moreno (1903) was launched in 1903 but sold to Japan while still incomplete at the end of the Argentine–Chilean naval arms race, and renamed Nisshin. It was expended as a target ship in 1936 but was later raised and again expended as a target in 1942.
- ARA Moreno was a Rivadavia-class battleship launched in 1911 and sold for scrap in 1957.
