= 12-inch/50-caliber gun =

There have been a number of 12" guns with 50 caliber length:

- 12-inch/50-caliber Mark 7 gun, 1910 US naval gun
- 12-inch/50-caliber Mark 8 gun, 1939 US naval gun
- 12-inch/50-caliber gun (Argentina), probably based on the 1910 US naval gun, used only in the Argentinian Rivadavia-class battleships
- BL 12-inch Mk XI – XII naval gun, British naval gun
- 30.5 cm SK L/50 gun, German naval gun
- Obukhovskii 12-inch/52-caliber Pattern 1907 gun, Russian naval and rail gun
