= Rivadavia-class battleship =

1914 Argentine battleship class

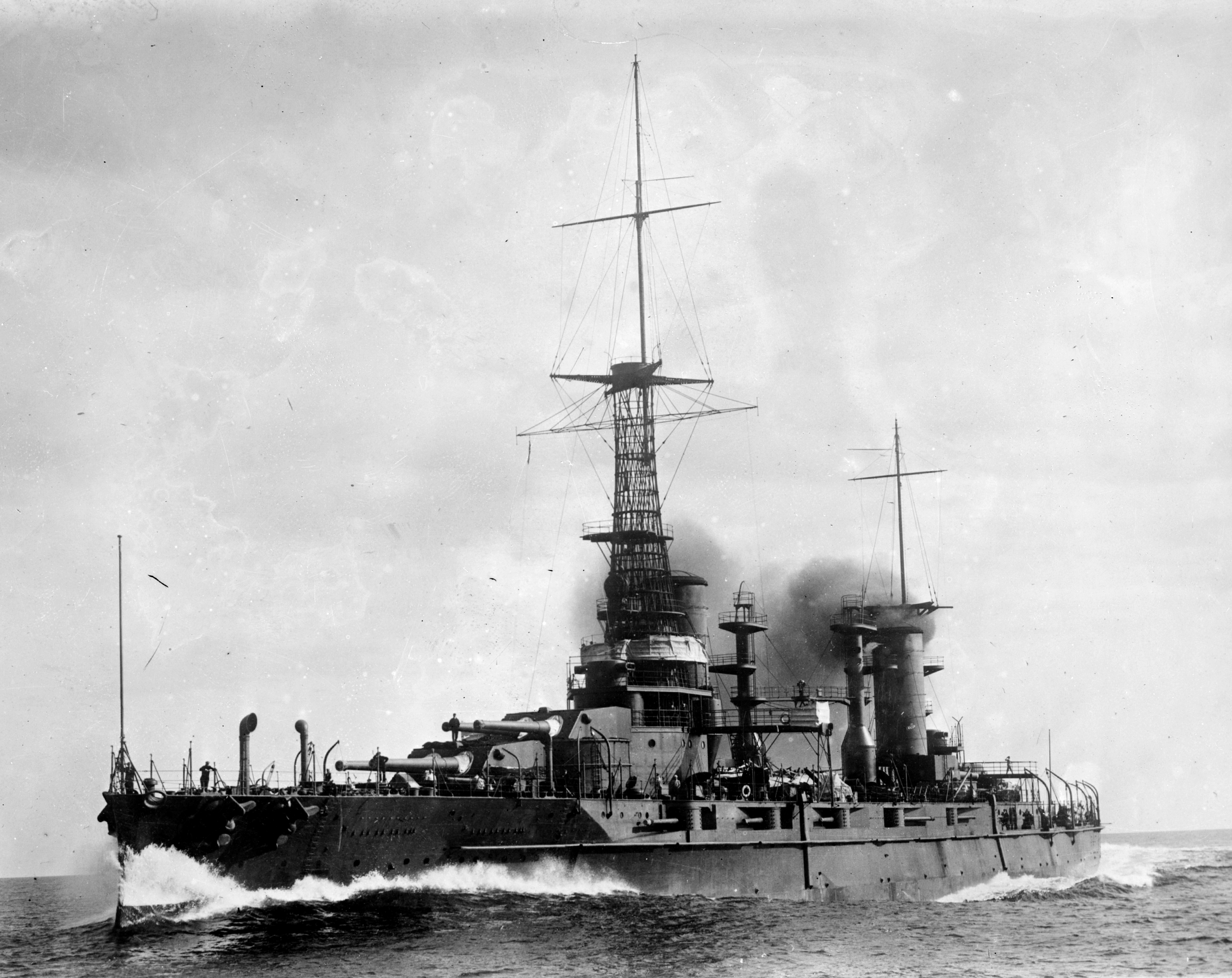
- Rivadavia c. 1914–15, possibly on a speed trial.

Class overview
- Builders: Fore River Shipbuilding Company (Rivadavia); New York Shipbuilding Corporation (Moreno)
- Operators: Argentine Navy
- Preceded by: Independencia class
- Succeeded by: None
- Cost: $12,000,000; £2,214,000
- Built: 1910–15
- In commission: 1914–56
- Completed: 2
- Preserved: 0

General characteristics 1915
- Type: Dreadnought battleship
- Displacement: 27,500 long tons (27,900 t) standard, 30,100 long tons (30,600 t) full load
- Length: 594 ft 9 in (181.28 m) oa, 585 ft (178 m) pp
- Beam: 98 ft 4.5 in (29.985 m)
- Draft: 27 ft 8.5 in (8.446 m)
- Propulsion: 3-shaft, Curtis geared turbines, 18 Babcock & Wilcox boilers; 40,000 shaft horsepower
- Speed: 22.5 knots (25.9 mph; 41.7 km/h)
- Range: 7,000 nautical miles (8,100 mi; 13,000 km) at 15 knots (17 mph; 28 km/h); 11,000 nautical miles (13,000 mi; 20,000 km) at 11 knots (13 mph; 20 km/h)
- Armament: 12 × 12 inch (305 mm)/50 guns; 12 × 6 inch (152 mm)/50 guns; 16 × 4 inch (102 mm) guns; 2 × 21 inch (533 mm) torpedo tubes
- Armor: Belt: 12–10 inches (300–250 mm); Turrets: 12 inches (305 mm); Casemates: 9^{1/3}–6^{1/5} inches (238–159 mm); Conning tower: 12 inches (300 mm)

The Rivadavia class consisted of two battleships designed by the American Fore River Shipbuilding Company for the Argentine Navy. Named Rivadavia and Moreno after important figures in Argentine history, they were Argentina's entry in the South American dreadnought race and a counter to Brazil's two Minas Geraes-class battleships.

In 1904, Brazil scrapped a previous naval building program in favor of an order that included three warships of the new "dreadnought" type, despite signs that such an action would spark a South American naval arms race. (Note: Three were ordered, but only two were built right away. The third's keel was laid down and ripped up several times before becoming Rio de Janeiro, later the British HMS Agincourt.) To counter this acquisition by a major rival, Argentina began seeking bids for at least two dreadnoughts in 1908. Over the next two years, shipbuilders from five countries vied for the contracts, complemented by efforts from their respective governments. Argentina was able to play this hyper-competitive environment to its own advantage by rejecting all of the initial proposals and calling for new ones that required the best aspects of each. They then repeated this process, despite complaints from shipbuilders that their trade secrets were being given away. The contracts were awarded to the lowest bidder, Fore River, in early 1910. This move shocked the European bidders, but could partly be explained by the American steel trust's ability to produce steel at a lower cost than any other country.

With increasing tensions in Europe that would eventually lead to the First World War, newspapers speculated that the Argentine dreadnoughts would be sold to another country. Under diplomatic pressure, Argentina kept the ships. Throughout their careers, Rivadavia and Moreno were based in Puerto Belgrano and served principally as training ships and diplomatic envoys. They were modernized in the United States in 1924 and 1925 and were inactive for much of the Second World War due to Argentina's neutrality. Struck from the navy lists on 1 February 1957, Rivadavia was scrapped in Italy beginning in 1959. Moreno was struck on 1 October 1956 and was towed to Japan in 1957 for scrapping.

== Background ==
The raison d'être for the Rivadavia class can be traced back to Argentine–Chilean territorial disputes over the boundary of Patagonia and control of the Beagle Channel going back to the 1840s. It nearly led to war in 1878 and kindled a naval arms race from 1887 to 1902 which was only settled via British mediation. As part of the three pacts which ended the dispute, restrictions were placed on the navies of both countries. The British Royal Navy bought two Swiftsure-class pre-dreadnought battleships that were being built for Chile, and Argentina sold its two Rivadavia-class armored cruisers under construction in Italy to Japan. Meanwhile, beginning in the late 1880s, Brazil's navy fell into obsolescence after an 1889 revolution, which deposed Emperor Dom Pedro II, and a 1893 civil war. By the turn of the 20th century it was lagging behind the Chilean and Argentine navies in quality and total tonnage, (Note: Chile's naval tonnage was 36,896 long tons (37,488 t), Argentina's 34,425 long tons (34,977 t), and Brazil's 27,661 long tons (28,105 t).) despite Brazil having nearly three times the population of Argentina and almost five times the population of Chile.

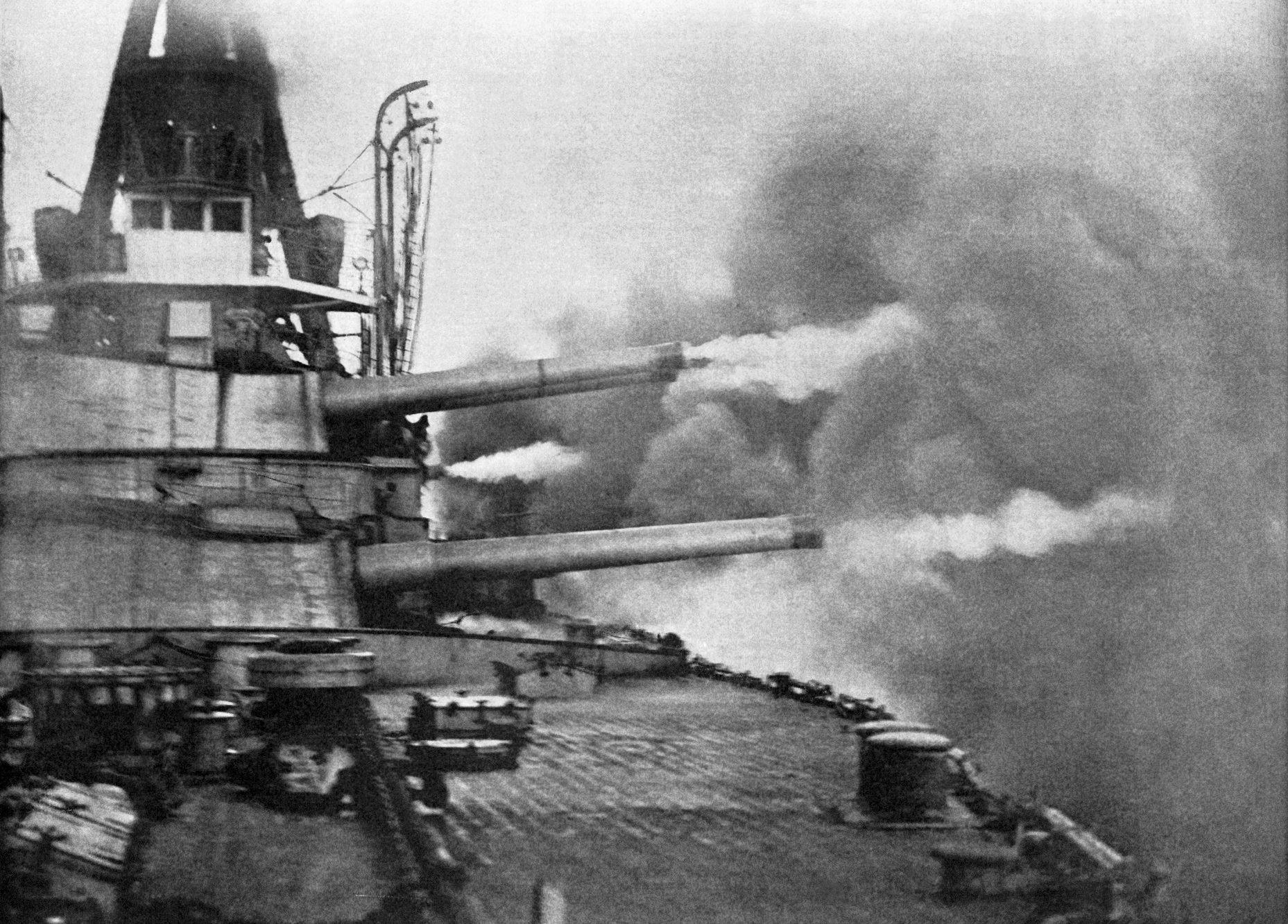
The gun trials of the Brazilian dreadnought Minas Geraes, the ship that began the dreadnought race. Here, all guns capable of training to the port side were fired, forming what was at that time the heaviest broadside ever fired off a warship.

By 1904, however, Brazil began to seriously consider upgrading its navy to compete with Argentina and Chile. Soaring demand for coffee and rubber brought the Brazilian economy an influx of revenue, which paid for a US$31.25 million (Note: Argentina uses "$" to represent their peso and "US$" or similar for the U.S. dollar; however, "$" generally means "dollar" in English sources and in this article.) naval repair scheme, a substantial amount for the time period. The bill authorized 28 ships, including three battleships and three armored cruisers. It was not possible to lay down the battleships until 1906, the same year the trend-setting HMS Dreadnought was constructed. This ship prompted the Brazilians to cancel their battleship plans in favor of two Minas Geraes-class dreadnoughts. The ordering of these powerful ships—designed to carry the heaviest armament in the world at the time—shocked Argentina and Chile. Historian Robert Scheina comments that the dreadnoughts alone "outclassed the entire [elderly] Argentinian fleet."

Debates raged in Argentina over the wisdom of acquiring dreadnoughts to counter Brazil's. The National Autonomist Party cabinet was in favor, despite a probable cost of nearly $10 million, but a specific plan for two 14,000-long-ton (14,225 t) battleships and ten destroyers was not popular with the public. Alarmed, the American ambassador to Brazil sent a cablegram to his Department of State, warning them of the destabilizing effects that would occur if the situation devolved into a full naval arms race.

Despite American entreaties to preclude the naval arms race, Brazil continued development on the ships. This, combined with renewed border disputes, particularly in the River Plate (Río de la Plata, literally "Silver River") area, spurred Argentina to move forward with plans for their own battleships. Inflamed by newspaper editors, opinion had swung towards supporting a naval building program. While an early plan called for $35 million to be invested—$7 million from foreign loans—a $55 million plan was adopted in August 1908. Hoping to end the arms race, Argentina made an offer to purchase one of the two Brazilian ships, but the refusal prompted the dispatch of an Argentine naval commission to Europe to acquire dreadnoughts.

== Bidding ==
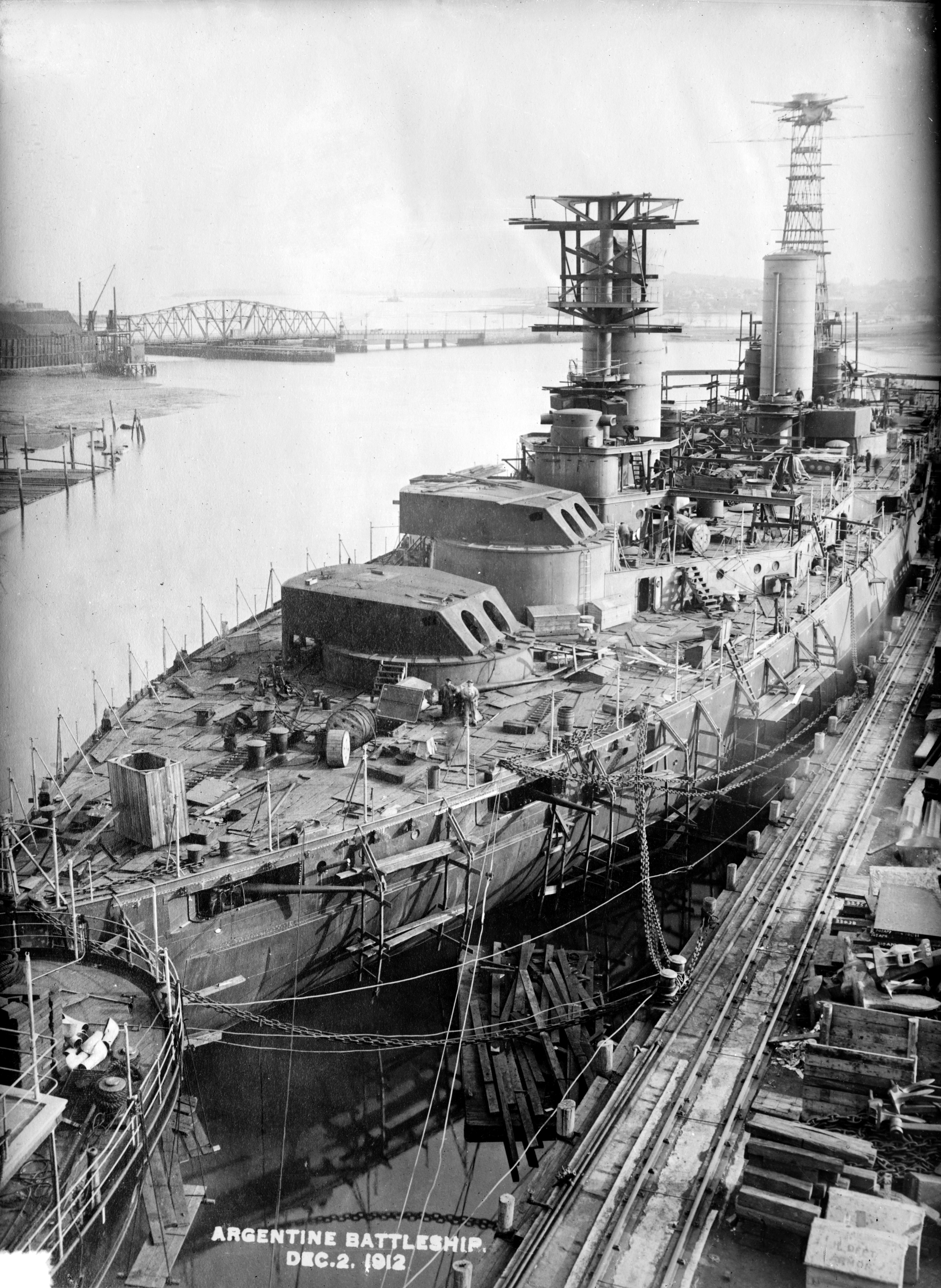
Rivadavia under construction, 2 December 1912.

Proposals from shipbuilders for two dreadnoughts (along with a possible third, to match Brazil should a third ship be ordered) and twelve destroyers were solicited in 1908 by open tender. In order to ensure that the designs reflected the most modern practices, the requirements were intentionally vague.

Fifteen shipyards from the United States, Great Britain, Germany, France, and Italy began bidding on the battleships. Diplomatic pressure to give the contracts was brought to bear from all these countries, especially the first three. (Note: Although the United States had done little to promote American armament interests in Latin America under President Theodore Roosevelt, this was drastically reversed after the election of William Howard Taft in 1908, most notably demonstrated with the creation of the Division of Latin American Affairs and the appointment of Charles H. Sherrill to be the American minister to Argentina. As part of this, American bankers were persuaded to offer a $10 million loan to Argentina to help pay for the dreadnoughts should they be built in the United States. From a global perspective, this was a concentrated effort to obtain naval contracts from countries as varied as Spain, Russia, Greece, Turkey, and China, as well as Latin America.) Even with this assistance, industry leaders in the United States believed that they had no chance in the bidding without active cooperation from their government, as Europe was the traditional arms supplier to Argentina (and to all of South America). Even when this was given, including the removal of import tariffs on hides from Argentina, promises for additional concessions if American shipbuilders were selected, and an offer to include the most technologically advanced fire-control system and torpedo tubes available on the Argentine battleships, the United States was widely viewed as a non-contender. Historian Seward W. Livermore remarked that "opposition to the United States was formidable. The naval commission was pro-British; the vice-president of the republic, Roque Sáenz Peña, favored Italy, where he had been the Argentine envoy for many years; and the minister of war wanted the contracts to go to Germany, so as to standardize the military and naval equipment of the country."

The president of the Newport News Shipbuilding and Drydock Company believed that the United States would not receive contracts due to what he saw as a large amount of European meddling in Argentina:

The political influence of foreign powers is being exerted in a very forceful manner to turn the business to English and Continental firms; the King of Italy, the German Emperor, and the force of English diplomacy are being made use of; and American firms will have very little consideration, I fear, unless our government will exert some very powerful influence in favor of this country.

The United States, however, found an ally in Buenos Aires' main daily newspaper, La Prensa. The owner, editor, and naval editor were all in favor of acquiring American-designed dreadnoughts. In addition, the paper found evidence of British wrongdoing in a related naval contract. Under public pressure, the naval commission was forced to reconsider its original list, which had placed Italy first and Britain second. It now featured the United States first, Britain second, and Italy last.

In a surprise move, the Argentine naval commission then threw out all of the opening tenders and called for another round of bidding; they simultaneously updated the specifications to include what were judged to be the best aspects of all the plans. The competitors were given three weeks to come up with new designs and cost estimates. After diplomatic protests, this was modified slightly; the original bids were kept, but alterations to attempt to conform to the new desired characteristics were allowed. (Note: While both Scheina and Livermore explicitly state that the commission threw out all the bids twice, neither makes it clear when this occurred. Livermore only goes into detail about one of these occasions, of which it is not clear if it is the second or third round. Hough states that Armstrong was forced to draw up four designs, which could mean that the bid was thrown out as many as three times.)

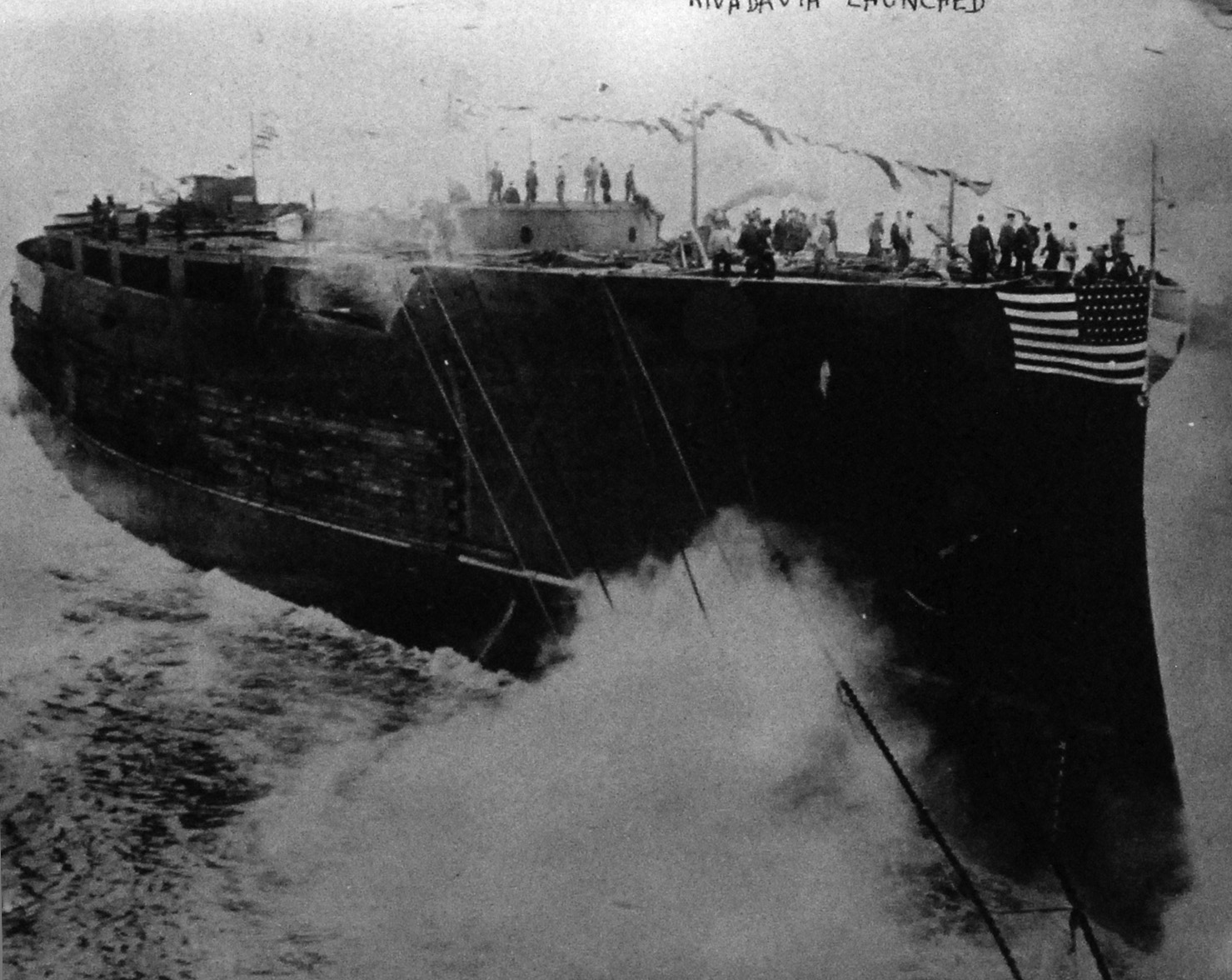
Rivadavia's launch, 16 August 1911.

The commission found that the Newport News Shipbuilding and Drydock Company bid was lowest on one battleship, and the Fore River Shipbuilding Company was lowest on the other. Despite a British attempt to allow the Armstrong Whitworth-Vickers team to lower their price by $570,000, prompt American diplomacy granting various assurances regarding recent events between the United States and Brazil, the upcoming 1910 Pan-American Conference, and a guarantee of American participation in the Argentine centennial celebrations secured the battleship contracts for Fore River on 21 January 1910. (Note: There were five specific assurances (quoted from Livermore): A denial that the United States contemplated any understanding with Brazil in regard to joint or simultaneous action in reference to Latin-American affairs.; A statement from Secretary Knox giving that Senor Portela, the Argentine minister, credit for the suggestion of British mediation in the Alsop case—or at least denying that Senor Nabuco, the Brazilian ambassador, was the first to suggest it.; A specific denial for the benefit of Senor de la Plaza, the foreign minister, that the state department had ever acknowledged the claim of the Brazilian foreign office for credit in the settlement of the Alsop case.; A substantial congressional appropriation for the Pan-American conference in Buenos Aires in July 1910.; The dispatch of a squadron of American warships to the Argentine Centennial Celebration in May 1910.; The United States to discourage Brazil and Uruguay from raising the question of jurisdiction of the waters of the Rio de la Plata.) The maximum price Fore River tendered, $10.7 million, underbid the British by more than $973,000, but their ship's displacement was 2,000 long tons (2,000 t) smaller, the belt armor was 2 inches (51 mm) thinner, and the top speed was slightly lower. Orders for the twelve destroyers were divided among Britain, France, and Germany.

Rivadavia was built by Fore River at its shipyard in Massachusetts, but they were contractually obligated to subcontract the second ship to a different shipyard in the hope that both would be completed faster, so Moreno was constructed by the New York Shipbuilding Corporation of Camden, New Jersey. The steel for the ships was largely supplied by the Bethlehem Steel Company of Pennsylvania, which, due to their ability to produce steel at a lower price than other nations, was an integral cost-saving measure. The Secretary of the Argentine Naval Commission, the body which chose the final design, said the reason the American tender was lower than that of the English was that "steel for construction work and armor-plating is a great deal cheaper in the United States than in England. Wages are higher there, but the contractors ... are able to obtain it more cheaply owing to the manipulations of the Steel Trust." (Note: The disparity in cost per ton was quite large (units are pounds sterling): American, 78.3; Italian, 85.9; British, 86.3; French, 87.4; and German, 88.2.)

A third dreadnought, provided for in the contract, was strongly supported by Argentina and by U.S. diplomats during 1910, while the Minas Geraes class was still under construction. La Prensa and one of its rivals, La Argentina, heavily advocated a third ship; the latter even started a petition to raise money for a new battleship. An American diplomat wrote back to the United States that "this newspaper rivalry promises the early conclusion of a movement which means a third battleship whether by public subscription or by Government funds." However, Brazil's 21–26 November Revolt of the Lash—in which the three most powerful ships in the fleet (the battleships Minas Geraes and São Paulo and the cruiser Bahia) and several smaller warships violently rebelled—crushed the previous sentiment for a new battleship. About two years later in October 1912, a third dreadnought was authorized by Argentina in case Brazil's Rio de Janeiro was completed and delivered. The ship was never named or built, as Rio de Janeiro was sold to the Ottoman Empire due to monetary issues, and a later planned Brazilian ship (Riachuelo) was canceled due to the beginning of the First World War.

== International reaction ==
The choice of Fore River came as a complete surprise to the European bidders. Britain's reaction in particular was scathing: Sir John H. Biles, a professor and well-known naval architect, decried the bidding process as "unethical":

... it may be presumed that everything ... good in the first proposals [was] seized upon by the Argentine authorities and asked for in the new design. This second request went not only to British builders but to all the builders of the world, and in this way it is exceedingly probable that a serious leakage of ideas and practice of our ships was disseminated through the world by the Argentine government.... The third inquiry that was issued showed to all the builders of the world what has been eliminated or modified in the second inquiry; and so the process of leakage went merrily on, and with it that of the education of foreign builders and the Argentine government.

Various British newspapers also cried foul. The Evening Standard believed that as "Argentina's greatest creditor and greatest client", Britain ought to have been awarded the two ships. The Times took a different track, accusing American shipbuilders of slashing prices to an obscene degree, (Note: Ironically, the New York Herald had previously stated on 17 January 1909 that it believed the British would eventually win the Argentine contracts by slashing prices.) and accusing the government of exerting undue diplomatic pressure to obtain the contracts.

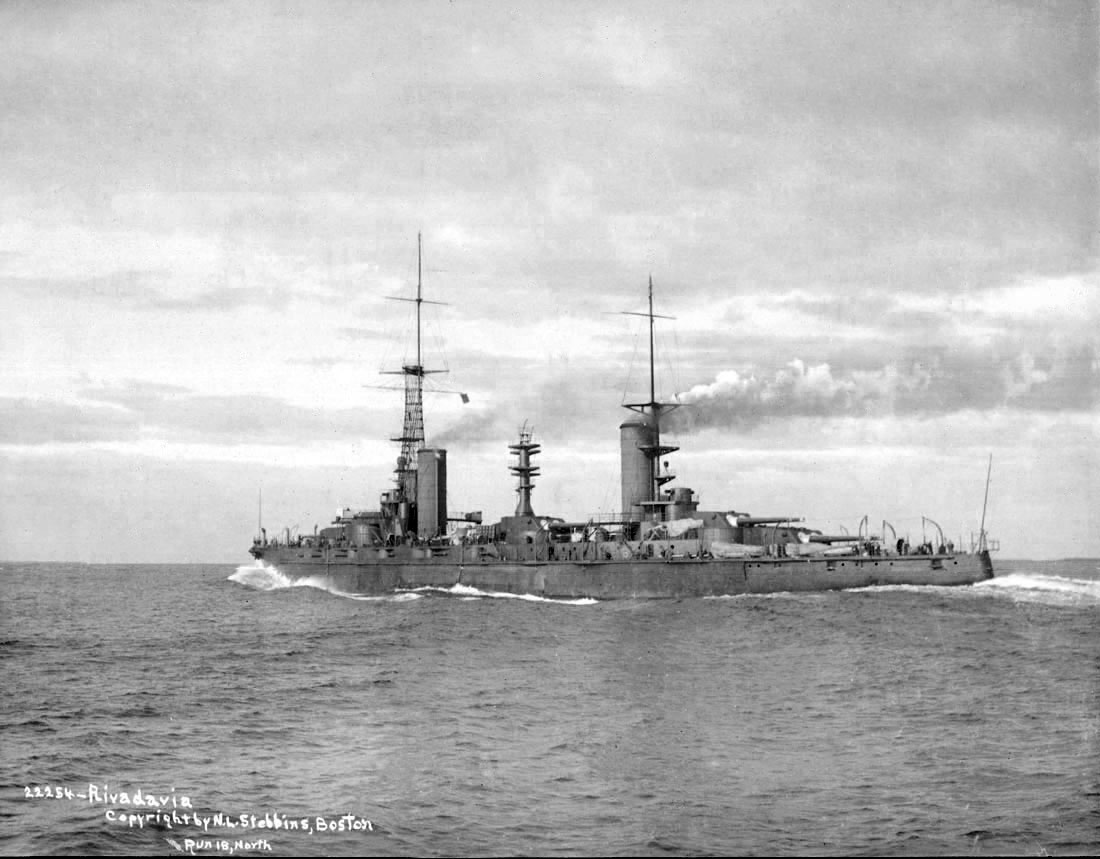
Rivadavia on its speed trials

New Zealand's Evening Post noted that the United States had previously built major warships for other countries, including Russia, and Britain's ally Japan, and commented, "The severity of the blow to England rests in ... the amount of English capital in [Argentina]", possibly echoing the Evening Standard's argument. They referred to a "startling" fact printed by the Daily Mail: the steel used for the armor of the American design was obtained for a much lower price. With Bethlehem's ability to produce it at £8 less per ton than British foundries, a cost savings of more than 10% in steel over the British ship could be realized.

Germany asserted that the United States was given the opportunity to view the other nations' tenders and lower their price accordingly. Germany also alleged that the United States had secured the deal by pledging to come to Argentina's defense should they become embroiled in a military conflict.

The New York Times noted that with Argentina's and Brazil's dreadnought orders, countries in North and South America were building the five biggest capital ships in the world (Brazil's Rio de Janeiro, Argentina's Rivadavia and Moreno, and the United States' New York and Texas) in addition to seven of the ten largest (including the United States' Wyoming and Arkansas). Shortly after Rivadavia had completed its trials, the U.S. Navy's Board of Inspection and Survey remarked that the ship "handle[d] remarkably well ... with comparatively minor modifications the vessel would practically meet the requirements of our own vessels." The Board of Inspection was less pleased with the wing turrets, stating that "while theoretically the Rivadavia has an ahead and astern fire of six guns, this is not so in reality, as it is almost certain that the blast from the waist turrets would dish in the smokepipes and damage the uptakes."

== Possible sale ==
After Brazil sold Rio de Janeiro to the Ottoman Empire, Argentina began to actively seek a buyer for their two ships so the profits could be invested in education. In the tension that preceded the First World War, there were many suitors. The United States, however, abhorred the idea of their latest technological advances falling into the hands of a possible future combat opponent. While the contract allowed the United States Navy an option to acquire the ships if a deal was reached with a third nation, the Navy did not want the ships; with the rapid advances in dreadnought technology, such as the "all or nothing" armor arrangement, even new ships like Rivadavia and Moreno were seen as outmoded.

Three bills directing that the battleships be sold were introduced into the Argentine National Congress in the summer of 1914, but all were defeated. Still, soon after the beginning of the First World War, the German ambassador to Argentina alleged to the U.S. State Department that Britain's Royal Navy was going to take over the ships as soon as the ships reached the River Plate, and the British put diplomatic pressure on the United States to try to ensure the ships were not sold to any other country (as this new country could in turn sell them to Germany). (Note: This was possibly referencing an earlier (March 1914) incident where French bankers—given direction by Russia—offered Argentina twice the amount they paid for the Rivadavia-class ships so that the ships could be turned over to Greece. Scheina mentions a 1913 Russian attempt to purchase both Argentine and both Chilean battleships, but gives no specifics.) Italy, the Ottomans, and Greece were all reportedly interested in buying both ships, the latter as a counter to the Ottoman purchase of Rio de Janeiro. The United States, worried that its neutrality would not be respected and its technology would be released for study to a foreign competitor, put diplomatic pressure on Argentina to keep the ships, which it eventually did.

== Design influences ==
The Rivadavia design was very similar to a 1906 proposal from Fore River for an American dreadnought class. (Note: The plan from the Bureau of Construction and Repair was selected over that of Fore River and was used for the two Delawares, Delaware and North Dakota.) This ship would have mounted a main battery of fourteen 12-inch (300 mm) guns in twin turrets (two superfiring fore, two wing, and three non-superfiring aft), a secondary battery of twenty 4-inch (102 mm) guns and four torpedo tubes on a hull of 22,000 long tons (22,000 t) that would be capable of 21 knots (24 mph; 39 km/h). Foreign practices also bore a large influence on the design; most were acquired through the unique design process of rejecting multiple bids and calling for the best aspects of each. For example, the superfiring arrangement of the main battery was an American innovation, while the wing turrets were similar to British designs of the time. The secondary battery of 6-inch (152 mm) guns and the three-shaft system were influenced by German design practices, while the engine and boiler layout was reminiscent of the Italian battleship Dante Alighieri.

== Service histories ==
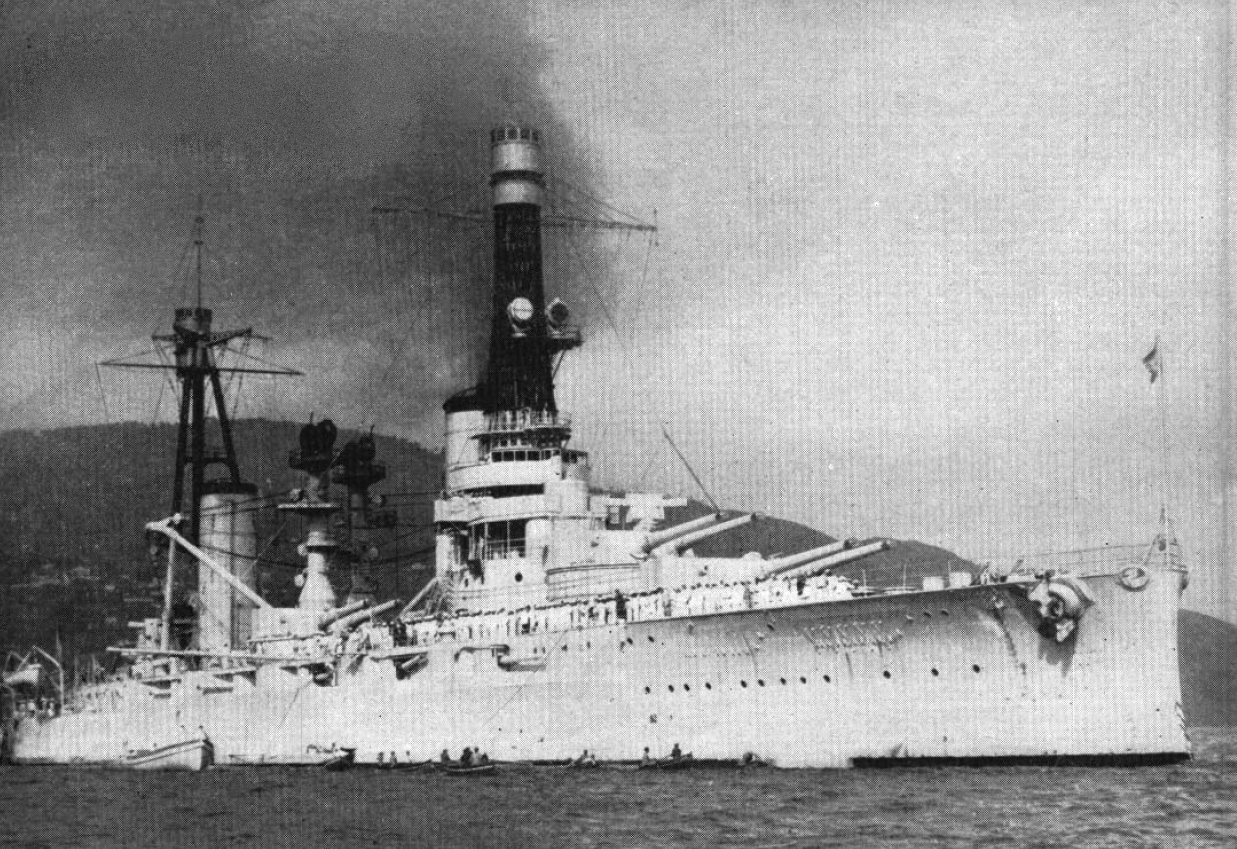
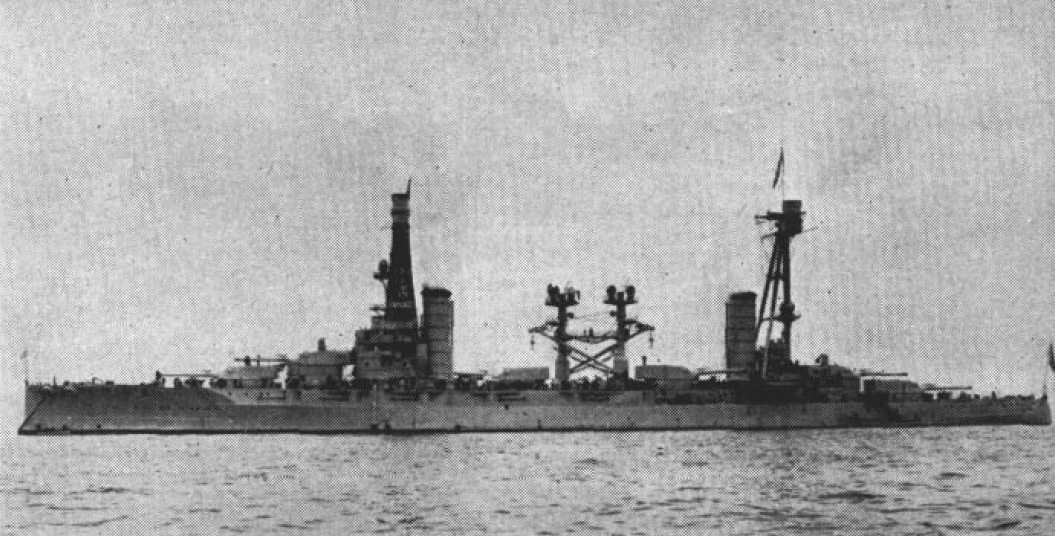
The two battleships near the end of their lives: Rivadavia in 1948 (top), and Moreno in 1947 (bottom).

Rivadavia was named after Bernardino Rivadavia, the first president of Argentina, and was built by Fore River Shipyard. The ship was laid down on 25 May 1910, launched on 26 August 1911, and completed in December 1914. Moreno was named after Mariano Moreno, a member of the first Argentine government; laid down on 9 July 1910 by New York Shipbuilding Corporation, it was launched on 23 September 1911 and completed in February 1915. Both ships had engine trouble soon after completion: Rivadavia's completion was delayed due to a damaged turbine, while Moreno had an entire turbine fail while on its trials. The ships were also plagued by an abnormally high coal consumption even after their trials. (Note: One 1918 voyage from Buenos Aires to New York and back required about 15,000 long tons (15,000 t) of coal, 4,000 long tons (4,100 t) more than expected.)

The ships finally arrived in Argentina in February and May 1915, respectively. In the early 1920s, both ships spent time in the reserve fleet due to an economic depression, but enough money was available by 1924 to have the dreadnoughts modernized in the United States. Both refits included a conversion from coal to fuel oil, a new fire-control system, and other minor improvements. In the 1930s they participated in training cruises and diplomatic trips, including:

- Moreno's 1933 visit to Brazil with Argentine president Agustín Pedro Justo aboard;
- A second visit in 1934 to mark the centennial of Brazilian independence;
- Rivadavia's and Moreno's 1937 voyage to Europe, where they visited Brest (France), Wilhelmshaven, Bremen, and Hamburg (Germany);
- Moreno's additional participation on the same voyage in the British Spithead Naval Review, where the New York Times' Hanson Baldwin described it as "a strange vestigial sea monster in this company of more modern fighting ships";
- Rivadavia's and Moreno's 1939 training cruise to Brazil with naval cadets embarked; with the beginning of the Second World War in September, destroyers had to be sent from Argentina to escort them home.

During the war, both ships were mainly inactive due to Argentine neutrality. Rivadavia undertook a last diplomatic cruise to Trinidad, Venezuela, and Colombia in 1946, but both ships were immobile by 1948. Moreno was stricken from the naval register on 1 October 1956 and was brought to Japan in 1957 for scrapping. Rivadavia was stricken on 1 February 1957 and scrapped in Italy beginning in 1959. The money gained from selling the two dreadnoughts along with an older armored cruiser, Pueyrredón, was used to buy an aircraft carrier from the United Kingdom, Independencia (ex-Warrior).

== Specifications ==
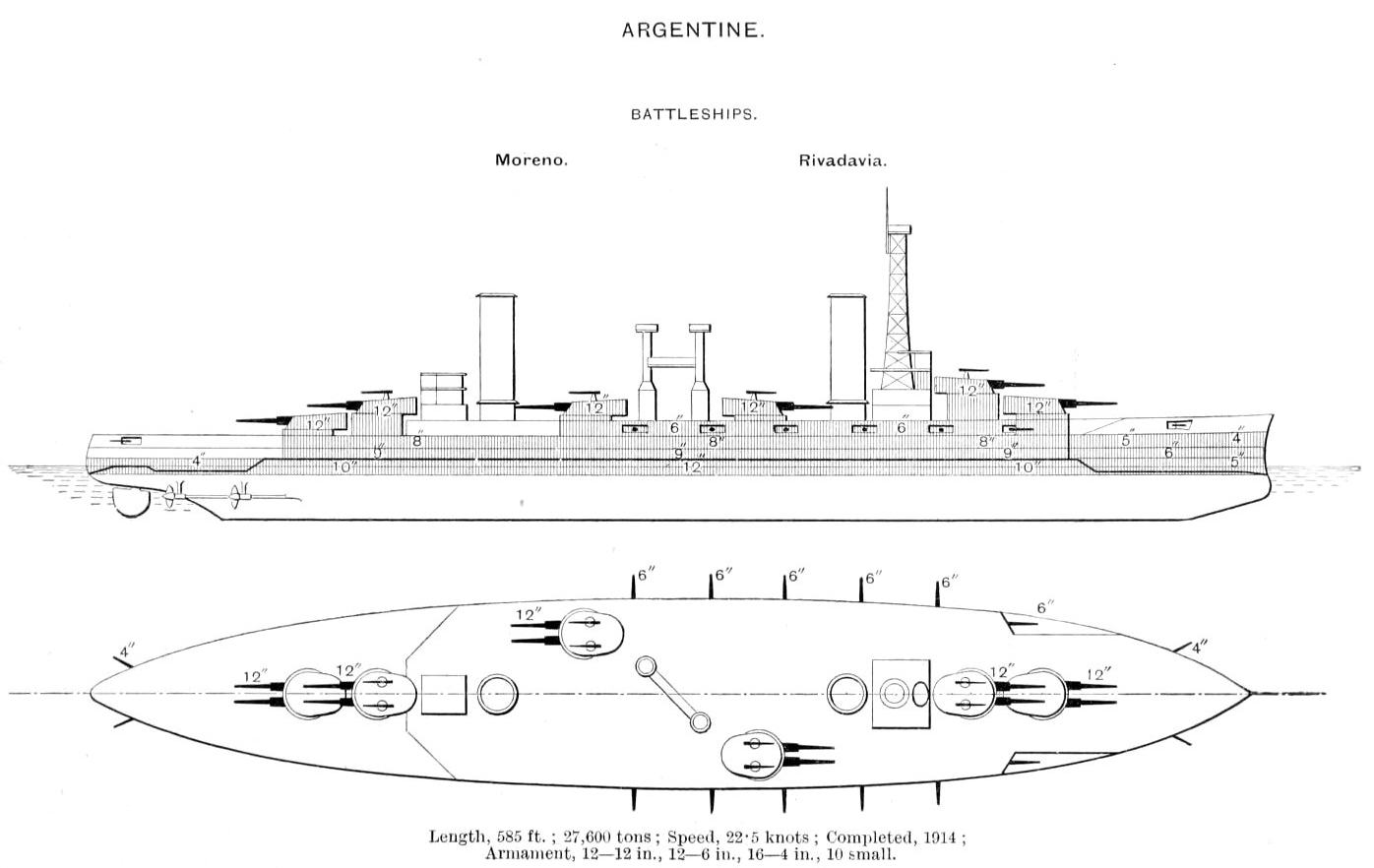
The Rivadavia class were the second dreadnought class purchased by a South American country and the only ones to not be built by a British company. Ordered in response to the Minas Geraes class, they mounted the same-size main battery as the Brazilian ships (12-inch), but the Argentine ships were much larger and significantly better-armored.

The two ships of the Rivadavia class were 594 feet 9 inches (181.28 m) overall and 585 feet (178 m) between perpendiculars. They had a beam of 98 feet 4.5 inches (29.985 m), a normal draft of 27 feet 8.5 inches (8.446 m), and displaced 27,500 long tons (27,900 t) normally and 30,100 long tons (30,600 t) at full load. The ships were staffed by 130 officers and about 1000 enlisted men.

For armament, the Rivadavia class was equipped with a main battery of twelve 12-inch/50 caliber guns, a secondary battery of twelve 6 inch (152 mm)/50 and twelve 4-inch (102 mm)/50 quick-firing guns, and two 21-inch (533 mm) torpedo tubes.

The 12"/50 was a Bethlehem development. It was most likely based on the weapon used in the United States' Wyoming-class battleship, the 12"/50 caliber Mark 7 gun. The twelve guns were mounted in six twin turrets. Four turrets were superfiring fore and aft, while the other two were located en echelon in wing turrets. The latter weapons could, in theory, fire on a 180° range on their respective sides of the hull and 100° on the other, but in reality this was not possible, as the blast damage from the weapons would damage the ship. A more reasonable estimate would be 90° on their sides. The 6-inch secondary armament was placed in casemates, with six on either side of the ship. For protection, they were provided with 6 inches of armor. The 4-inch weaponry, intended for use against marauding destroyers, was mounted unarmored in various places around the ship, including the main deck, superstructure, and far up near the bow. As originally built, there were sixteen 4-inch guns, but four of those were replaced with four 3-inch AA guns and four 3-pounders during the 1924–1926 modernization. The torpedo tubes were located underneath the waterline and were loaded in a dedicated compartment.

Full ammunition loads were 1,440 rounds for the 12-inch guns (120 per gun), 3,600 rounds for the 6-inch (300), 5,600 rounds for the 4-inch (350), and 16 torpedoes manufactured by Whitehead. To assist the main battery with targeting during a battle, the two ships were equipped with two rangefinders from Barr & Stroud, located above the conning towers.

Rivadavia and Moreno used Brown–Curtis geared steam turbines, powered by 18 Babcock & Wilcox boilers and connected to three propellers. With a total output of about 40,000 shaft horsepower (30,000 kW), the ships were designed to travel at a maximum speed of 22.5 knots (41.7 km/h; 25.9 mph) and may have been capable of slightly more. At speeds of 11 to 15 knots (20 to 28 km/h; 13 to 17 mph), their endurance ranged from 11,000 to 7,000 nautical miles (20,000 to 13,000 km; 12,700 to 8,100 mi), respectively. Their fuel was a coal and oil mix and the ships carried 3,900 long tons (4,000 t) of the former and 590 long tons (600 t) of the latter.

Typical of American-designed dreadnoughts at the time, the Rivadavia class included substantial armor protection. A 12-inch (305 mm) belt was fitted amidships, covering 5 feet (1.5 m) above and 6 feet (1.8 m) below the designed waterline, gradually decreasing towards the bow and stern to 5 inches (127 mm) and 4 inches (100 mm), respectively. The gun turrets received heavy armor, including 12 inches (305 mm) on the front, 9 inches (230 mm) on the sides, 9.5 inches (240 mm) on the back, and 4 inches (100 mm) on the top. Deck armor consisted of .5 inches (13 mm) medium steel and 2 inches (51 mm) nickel steel.

== See also ==
- Dreadnoughtus – a fossilized dinosaur found in Patagonia, Argentina, named in part because of the Rivadavia class
