= 12-inch/50-caliber gun (Argentina) =

12"/50 caliber Bethlehem gun
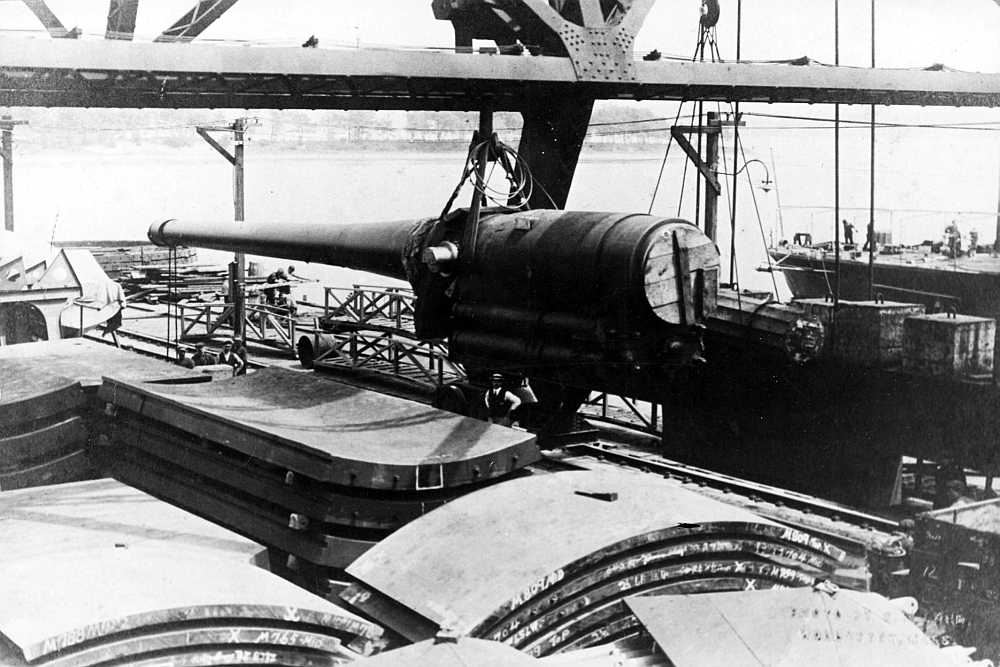
- a main gun of the battleship ARA Moreno during its construction, sometime between 1910 and 1915.
- Type: Naval gun
- Place of origin: United States

Service history
- In service: 1915–1956
- Used by: Rivadavia-class battleships US Navy (coastal batteries); Brazil (coastal batteries)
- Wars: World War I, World War II

Production history
- Designed: 1910
- Manufacturer: Bethlehem Steel Corporation

Specifications
- Mass: 66 tons
- Barrel length: 50 ft 6 in (15.39 m) bore (50 cal)
- Caliber: 12 inches (304.8 mm)
- Recoil: 38 inches (97 cm)
- Rate of fire: 2.0–3.0 rounds per minute
- Maximum firing range: 24,000 yd (22,000 m)

The 12"/50 caliber Bethlehem gun was a US naval gun designed in 1910 as the main armament for the Argentine Navy's dreadnought battleships of the Rivadavia class.

== Design ==
The gun was designed in 1910, and it was probably based on the US 12"/50 (30.5 cm) Mark 7 naval gun with a breech weight added. The guns were manufactured at the Bethlehem Steel Corporation. Twelve 305 mm guns were mounted in six twin (2-gun) turrets, two in front, two behind, and one on each side, on each of the ships in the class.

== Measurements and Capabilities ==
The gun weighed 66 tons including the breech and was capable of an average rate of fire of 2–3 rounds a minute. It could throw an 870 lb. (394.6 kg) Mark 15 armor-piercing shell 24,000 yards (21,950 meters) at an elevation of 14.7°, while the "barrel life" of the guns was 200 shots.

The previous 12" gun, manufactured for the U.S. Navy, was the Mark 7 version, a very similar gun which had been designed and installed in the 1912 era Wyoming-class battleships.

== Service ==
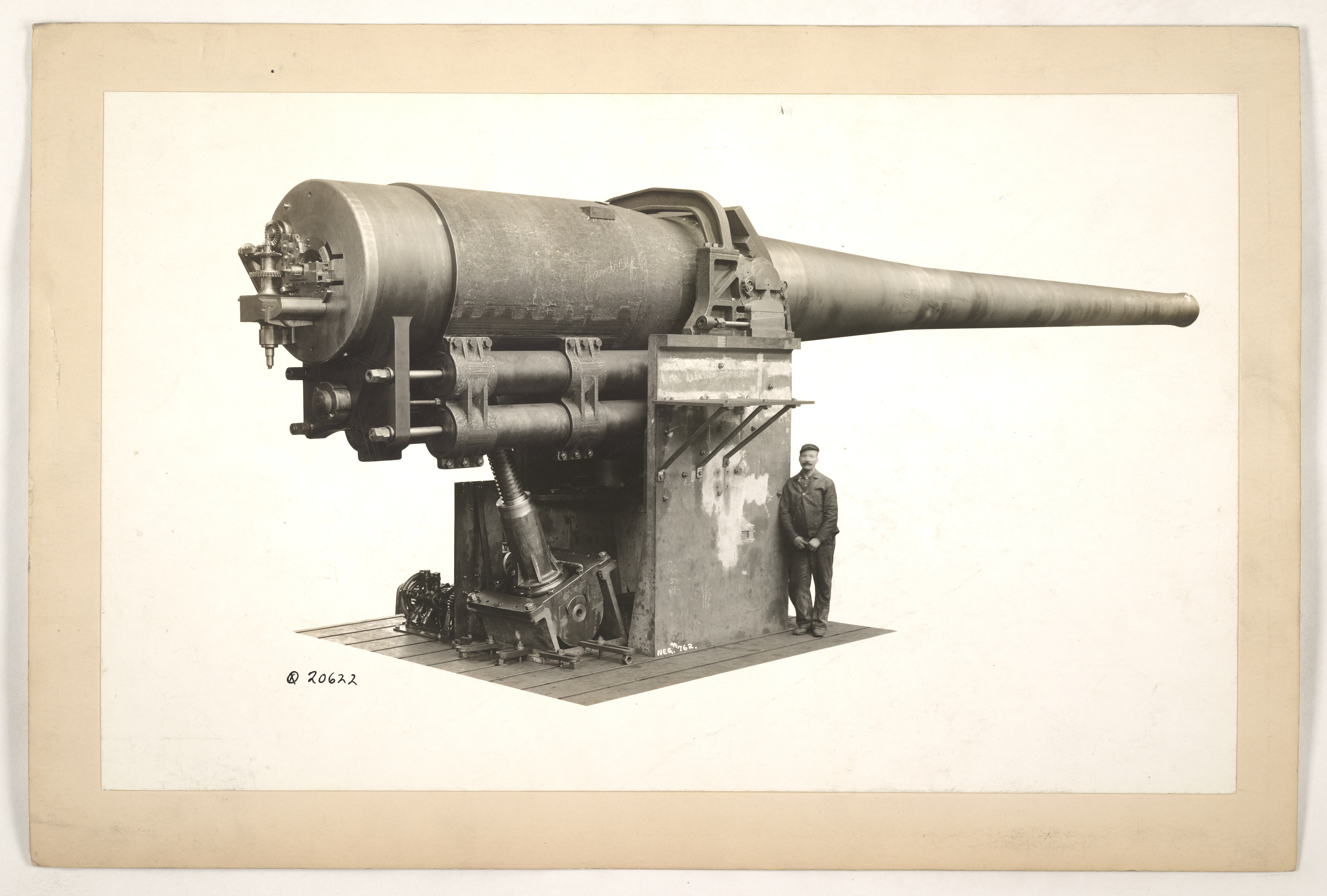
12"/50 Bethlehem steel gun on a coastal mount for Chile

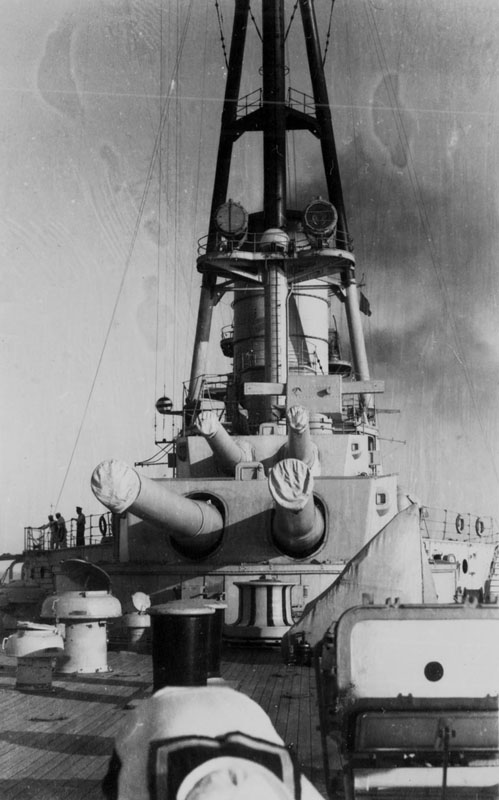
Main deck and guns of Moreno

This gun was installed in the Argentine Navy Rivadavia-class battleships Rivadavia and Moreno. Six more guns were later contracted by Chile for coastal defence, but they were requisitioned by the US government due to the WWI. Half was converted for railway sliding carriages and half was saved as spares. In 1940 all six gun tubes were bought by Brazil from US military surplus but never used.

== See also ==
- BL 12 inch Mk XI – XII naval gun British equivalent
- Obukhovskii 12"/52 Pattern 1907 gun Russian equivalent
- 30.5 cm SK L/50 gun German equivalent
- List of naval guns
