= Sarge Connally =

American baseball player (1898–1978)

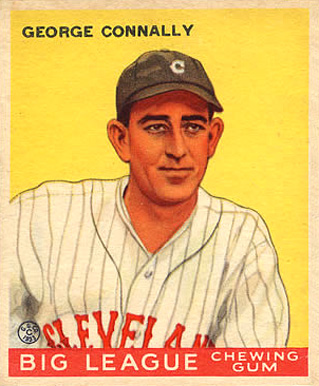
- Sarge Connally 1933 Goudey baseball card
- Pitcher
- Born: August 31, 1898; McGregor, Texas, U.S.
- Died: January 27, 1978 (aged 79); Houston, Texas, U.S.
- Batted: Right Threw: Right

MLB debut
- September 10, 1921, for the Chicago White Sox

Last MLB appearance
- July 18, 1934, for the Cleveland Indians

MLB statistics
- Win–loss record: 49–60
- Earned run average: 4.30
- Strikeouts: 345
- Stats at Baseball Reference

Teams
- Chicago White Sox (1921, 1923–1929); Cleveland Indians (1931–1934)

George Walter "Sarge" Connally (August 31, 1898 – January 27, 1978) was an American professional baseball pitcher in Major League Baseball. He played for the Chicago White Sox and Cleveland Indians.

Connally served in the United States Marine Corps during World War I. He reportedly received a silver medal from the United States Congress for saving the life of a drowning fireman from the USS Wyoming off the coast of San Pedro, California, in 1920.
