= USS Wyoming =

One ship of the United States Navy has been named USS Wyoming in honor of the Wyoming Valley in eastern Pennsylvania that runs along the Susquehanna River. Three others have been named in honor of the state of Wyoming.

- USS Wyoming (1859) was a screw sloop that operated on the California coast during the American Civil War and fought the forces of a Japanese warlord in the Battle of Shimonoseki.
- USS Wyoming (BM-10), an Arkansas-class monitor, later renamed USS Cheyenne.
- USS Wyoming (BB-32) was the lead ship of her class of battleships.
- USS Wyoming (SSBN-742) is an Ohio-class ballistic missile submarine.

== See also ==
- SS Equality State, an auxiliary Keystone State-class crane ship launched in 1961 and in ready reserve since 1989.
