= Wyoming Township =

Wyoming Township may refer to one of the following places in the United States:

- Wyoming Township, Lee County, Illinois
- Wyoming Township, Jones County, Iowa
- Wyoming, Michigan (formerly Wyoming Township, Michigan)
- Wyoming Township, Chisago County, Minnesota
- Wyoming Township, Holt County, Nebraska

See also

- Wyoming (disambiguation)
