= 12-inch/50-caliber Mark 7 gun =

12"/50 caliber Mark 5 Naval Gun
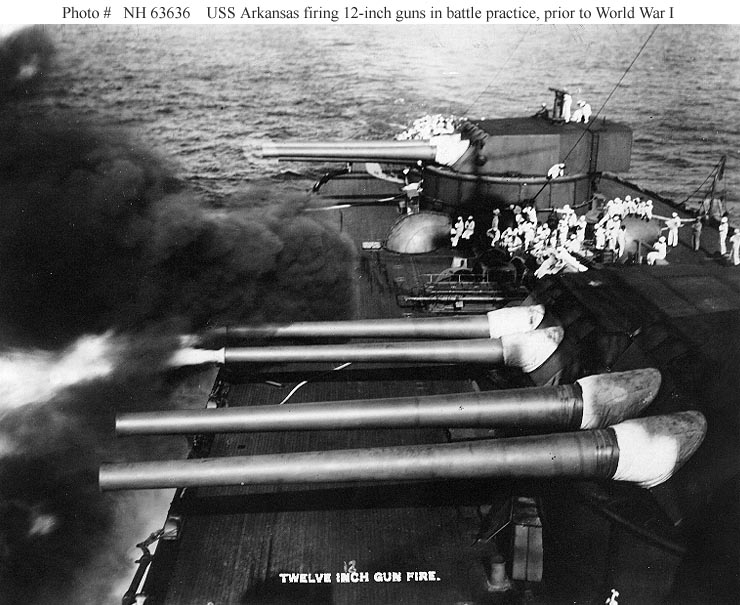
- USS Arkansas (BB-33) firing her 12"/50 guns in battle practice prior to World War I
- Type: Naval gun
- Place of origin: United States

Service history
- In service: 1912-1952
- Used by: United States Navy; Argentine Navy
- Wars: World War I; World War II

Production history
- Designer: Bureau of Ordnance
- Designed: 1910
- Manufacturer: U.S. Naval Gun Factory; Bethlehem Steel
- No. built: Mod 0: 28 (Nos. 180–182, 186–210); Mod 2: 3 (Nos. 183–185); Mod 3: 6 (Nos. 211–216); Export: 25 (Nos. 795–817, 919–920)
- Variants: Mods 0–19

Specifications
- Mass: 121,489 lb (55,106 kg) (without breech); 123,160 lb (55,860 kg) (with breech)
- Length: 50 ft 7.25 in (15.42 m)
- Barrel length: 49 ft 6.25 in (15.09 m) bore (49.5 calibers)
- Shell: 870 lb (390 kg)armor-piercing
- Caliber: 12 in (305 mm)
- Elevation: -5° to +15°
- Traverse: −150° to +150°
- Rate of fire: 2–3 rounds per minute
- Muzzle velocity: 2,900 ft/s (880 m/s) (full charge); 2,100 ft/s (640 m/s) (reduced charge)
- Effective firing range: 23,900 yd (21,900 m) at 15° elevation

The 12"/50 caliber Mark 7 gun (spoken "twelve-inch-fifty-caliber") was a United States Navy's naval gun that first entered service in 1912. Initially designed for use with the Wyoming class of dreadnought battleships, the Mark 7 also armed the Argentine Navy's Rivadavia-class battleships.

== Design and development ==
The 12-inch (305 mm)/50 caliber Mark 7 naval gun was only a slight improvement over the preceding American naval gun, the 12"/45 caliber Mark 5 gun. As such, it was a very similar weapon, having been lengthened by five calibers to allow for improved muzzle velocity, range, and penetrating power. Designed to the specifications of the Bureau of Ordnance, the Mark 7 was constructed at the U.S. Naval Gun Factory in Washington, D.C.

The Mark 7 weighed 124,140 lb (56,310 kg) with the breech and was capable of firing two to three times a minute. At maximum elevation of 15° it could fire an 870 lb (390 kg) shell approximately 20,000 yd (18,000 m). With an initial muzzle velocity of 2,900 ft/s (880 m/s), the gun had a barrel life of 200 rounds, and was capable of firing either armor piercing or Common projectiles.

As designed, the Mark 7 was capable of penetrating 17.4 in (440 mm) of Harvey plated side armor at 6,000 yd (5,500 m), 14.7 in (370 mm) at 9,000 yd (8,200 m), and 12.3 in (310 mm) at 12,000 yd (11,000 m). By comparison the 12"/45 caliber Mark 5 it replaced could penetrate 16.6 in (420 mm), 12.2 in (310 mm), and 9.9 in (250 mm) at those distances, respectively.

Bethlehem Steel built the first gun, No. 180. Mod 0, Nos. 181, 182, and 186–200, was a built-up gun consisting of a tube, jacket, and eight hoops, a screw-box liner with locking hoops and rings and hand operated and Smith-Asbury mechanism. The gun was constructed with nickel-steel and hooped to the muzzle.

Mod 1 was gun No. 180, rebuilt into gun No. 180L, with its chase hoops rebuilt along with a new conical nickel-steel liner, a smaller chamber, and the rifling increased.

Mod 2, gun Nos. 183–185, was a Mod 0 gun relined with a conical liner, a new chase locking hoop, and with a locking ring added. This brought the weight up to 125,498 lb (56,925 kg), with the breech. It also had a 25 cu in (410 cm^{3})-smaller chamber.

The Mod 3 guns, Nos. 211–216, were the last new guns built, all other Mods were Mod 0, 2, or 3 guns that were modified. These guns were built with a new simplified design, no liner, five hoops, a locking ring, along with a screw-box liner and a different gas check seat.

Mod 4, the twelve guns from Wyoming, relined in 1921–1923, had a conical one-step liner and uniform rifling with a new chase locking hoop and locking ring. With the Mod 5 an attempt was made to reline a Mod 1 with a uniform twist rifling, but it was dropped. Mod 6 relined Mod 2 with a uniform twist rifling along with a modified new chase hoop and locking ring. Mod 7 took the Mod 3 and used a one-step conical liner, uniform twist rifling, and added a tube and liner locking ring. Mod 8 was the Mod 0 or Mod 4 also using a one-step conical liner, uniform twist rifling that was secured by a tube and liner locking ring with a liner locking collar at the breech end. The Mod 8s that used Mod 0 guns also added a new chase hoop and locking ring. Mod 9 was a Mod 2 or Mod 6 that had a new liner with longitudinal clearances at the liner shoulders installed, uniform twist rifling along with a tube and liner locking ring and collar added at the breech end. Mod 10, like the Mod 9, was also a Mod 2 or Mod 6 that had a new liner with longitudinal clearance at the liner shoulders installed, uniform twist rifling along with a tube and liner locking ring and collar added at the breech end. The Mod 10 used Breech Mechanism Mark 9 instead of the Mark 8 on the previous Mods. Mod 11 was a Mod 7 that had the chamber lengthened, adding 235 cu in (3,851 cm^{3}), and a 3½° breech band seating slope and used Breech Mechanism Mark 12. Mod 12 used a Mod 10 and lengthened the chamber and added a 3½° breech band seating slope with Mod 13 being similar but of a Mod 8, Mod 14 used a Mod 9, Mod 15 used a Mod 7, Mod 16 used a Mod 10, Mod 17 used a Mod 8, and Mod 18 a Mod 9. Mod 19, the last modification, used a Mod 2 with its breech modified for the Smith-Asbury Breech Mechanism and the forward end of the chamber modified similar to the Mod 18, lengthened the chamber and added a 3½° breech band seating slope. The breech end was further modified by being machined out so that it could accommodate a gas check seat liner locking ring. The Mod 19 could also be used right or left handed by cutting a new slide keyway that was 180° from the original keyway.

== Naval Service ==
Ship	Gun Installed	Gun Mount
USS Wyoming (BB-32)	Mark 7: 12"/50 caliber	Mark 9: 6 × twin turrets
USS Arkansas (BB-33)	Mark 7: 12"/50 caliber	Mark 9: 6 × twin turrets
ARA Rivadavia	Mark 7: 12"/50 caliber	Mark 9: 6 × twin turrets
ARA Moreno	Mark 7: 12"/50 caliber	Mark 9: 6 × twin turrets
