= SS Equality State =

Crane ship of the United States Navy

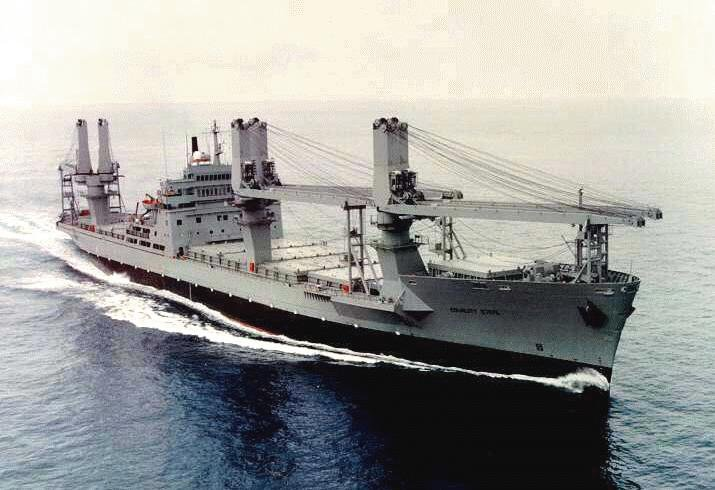
- SS Equality State (T-ACS-8)

History

United States
- Name: SS Equality State (T-ACS-8)
- Builder: Todd Shipyards, Los Angeles Division, San Pedro, California
- Laid down: 1961
- Launched: 11 May 1961
- Acquired: 1989
- In service: 4 March 1965
- Out of service: 28 July 2006
- Stricken: 31 August 2016
- Home port: Beaumont, TX
- Identification: IMO number: 5386605; MMSI number: 367140000; Callsign: WLRK
- Fate: Scrapped 29 June 2019
- Notes: Launched as SS Washington Mail

General characteristics
- Class & type: Keystone State-class crane ship
- Displacement: 31,500 tons
- Length: 668 ft 5 in (203.73 m)
- Beam: 76 ft 1 in (23.19 m)
- Draft: 33 ft 6 in (10.21 m)
- Propulsion: Single screw, 2 GE geared turbine powered, 22,000 HP., Two Combustion Engineering WT boilers
- Speed: 20 kn (23 mph; 37 km/h)
- Capacity: 1,100 Cargo Containers
- Complement: Full Operational Status: 89 civilian mariners Reduced Operational Status: 10 civilian mariners
- Armament: None
- Aviation facilities: None

SS Equality State (T-ACS-8) was a crane ship of the United States Navy. The ship was named for the state of Wyoming, which is also known as the Equality State. She was scrapped in June 2019.

== History ==
Equality State was laid down on 6 July 1960, as the break-bulk freighter SS Washington Mail, ON 287238, IMO 5386605, a Maritime Administration type (C4-S-1s) hull under MARAD contract (MA 86). Built by Todd Shipyards, Los Angeles Division, San Pedro, California, hull no. 77, she was launched on 11 May 1961, and delivered to MARAD 2 January 1962, entering service for American Mail Lines, a subsidiary of American President Lines. In 1971 she was lengthened and converted to a type (C6-S-1s) hull container ship by Bethlehem Steel, San Francisco, CA. On 26 November 1975 the ship was renamed SS President Roosevelt, after AML was merged into APL. She was sold to Delta Steamship Lines 7 September 1983, and renamed SS Santa Rosa. She was again sold to United States Lines in 1985 when USL absorbed Delta Line, and renamed SS American Builder. After the collapse of US Lines in 1986, the ship was returned to MARAD 6 April 1987 and laid up in the National Defense Reserve Fleet (NDRF) at Hampton Roads, VA. In 1989 she was converted to a type (C6-S1aq) Crane Ship by Tampa Shipyards, Tampa, Florida. Completed on 24 May 1989, she was assigned to the Ready Reserve Force (RRF), under operation control of the Military Sealift Command (MSC) and placed in service as SS Equality State (ACS-8). Equality State was berthed at Houston, TX. and assigned to Maritime Prepositioning Ship Squadron Three and was maintained in a four-day readiness status. Removed from MSC control, withdrawn from the RRF by reassignment to the National Defense Reserve Fleet (Beaumont, TX), 28 July 2006. She was designated for disposal in August 2016.
