= Wyoming Station =

Wyoming Station may refer to:

- Wyoming station (Delaware), a former station in Wyoming, Delaware
- Wyoming station (Illinois), a former station in Wyoming, Illinois
- Wyoming station (Ontario), a station in Wyoming, Ontario
- Wyoming station (SEPTA), a subway station in Philadelphia, Pennsylvania
- Wyoming Hill station, formerly called Wyoming, a commuter rail station in Melrose, Massachusetts
