= ARA Moreno =

Argentine Rivadavia-class battleship

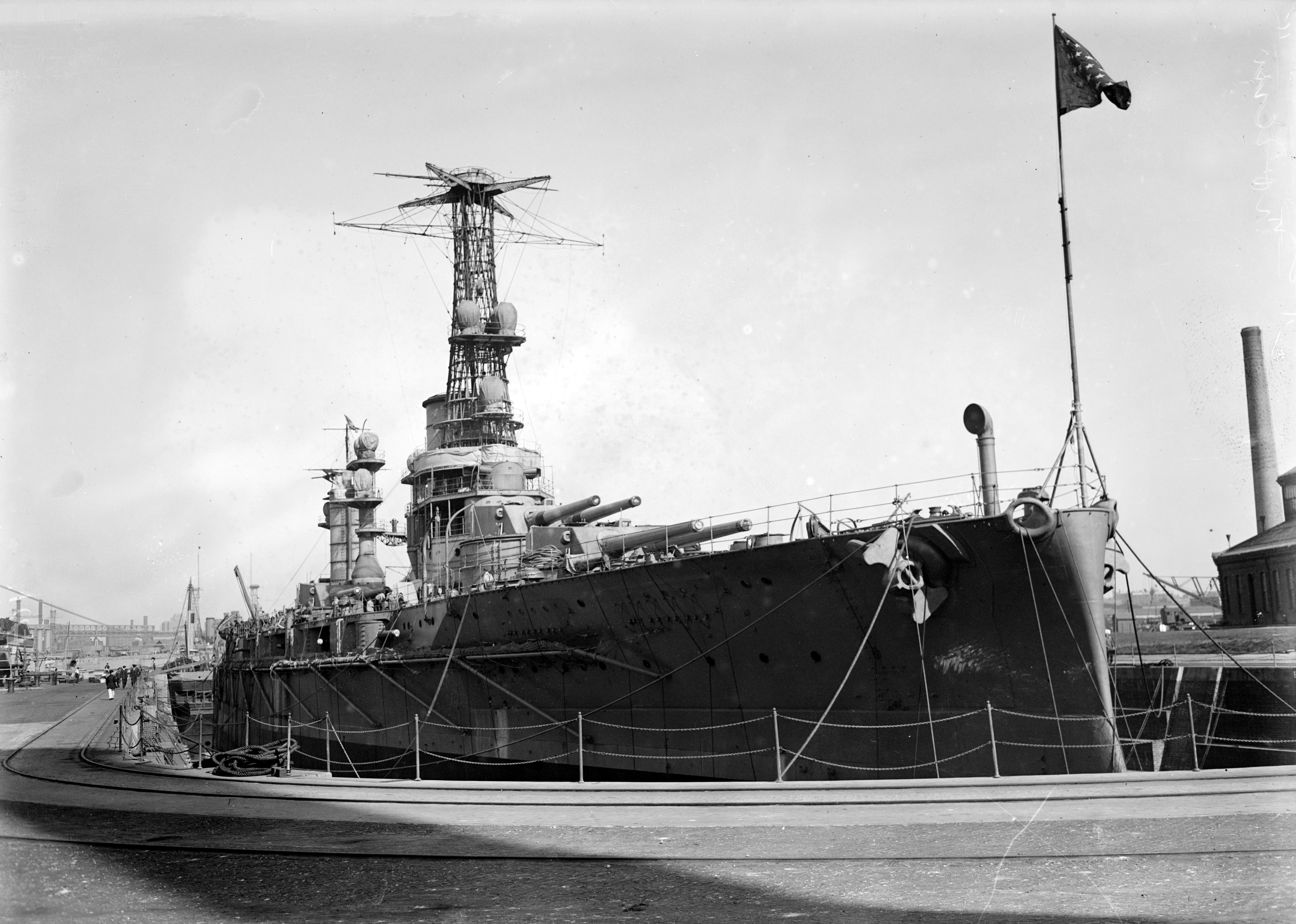
- ARA Moreno

History
- Name: Moreno
- Namesake: Mariano Moreno
- Builder: New York Shipbuilding; Camden, New Jersey
- Laid down: 9 July 1910
- Launched: 23 September 1911
- Commissioned: 26 February 1915
- Decommissioned: 1949
- Fate: Scrapped in Japan

General characteristics
- Class & type: Rivadavia-class battleship
- Displacement: 27,500 long tons (27,900 t) standard, 30,100 long tons (30,600 t) full load
- Length: 594 ft 9 in (181.28 m) oa, 585 ft (178 m) pp
- Beam: 98 ft 4.5 in (29.985 m)
- Draft: 27 ft 8.5 in (8.446 m)
- Propulsion: 3-shaft, Curtis geared turbines, 18 Babcock & Wilcox boilers; 40,000 shp (29,828 kW)
- Speed: 22.5 knots (25.9 mph; 41.7 km/h)
- Range: 7,000 nautical miles (8,100 mi; 13,000 km) at 15 knots (17 mph; 28 km/h); 11,000 nautical miles (13,000 mi; 20,000 km) at 11 knots (13 mph; 20 km/h)
- Armament: 12 × 12-inch (305 mm)/50 guns; 12 × 6-inch (152 mm)/50 guns; 16 × 4-inch (102 mm) guns; 2 × 21 inch (533 mm) torpedo tubes
- Armor: Belt: 12–10 inches (300–250 mm); Turrets: 12 inches (305 mm); Casemates: 9^{1/3}–6^{1/5} inches (238–159 mm); Conning tower: 12 inches (300 mm)

ARA Moreno (Note: "ARA" is an acronym for Armada de la República Argentina, literally "Navy of the Argentine Republic".) was a dreadnought battleship designed by the American Fore River Shipbuilding Company for the Argentine Navy. Named after Mariano Moreno, a key member of the first independent government of Argentina, the First Assembly (Primera Junta), Moreno was the second dreadnought of the Rivadavia class, and the fourth built during the South American dreadnought race.

Argentina placed orders for Moreno and its only sister ship, Rivadavia, in reply to a Brazilian naval building program. During their construction, the two dreadnoughts were subject to numerous rumors involving Argentina selling the two battleships to a country engaged in the First World War, but these proved to be false. After Moreno was completed in March 1915, a series of engine problems occurred during the sea trials which delayed its delivery to Argentina to May 1915. The next decade saw the ship based in Puerto Belgrano as part of the Argentine Navy's First Division before sailing to the United States for an extensive refit in 1924 and 1925. During the 1930s the ship was occupied with diplomatic cruises to Brazil, Uruguay, and Europe until the Second World War broke out. During this time, Moreno was employed little as Argentina was neutral. Decommissioned in 1949, Moreno was scrapped in Japan beginning in 1957.

== Background ==
Moreno's genesis can be traced to the numerous naval arms races between Chile and Argentina, which in turn were spawned by territorial disputes over their mutual borders in Patagonia and Puna de Atacama along with control of the Beagle Channel. Naval races flared up in the 1890s and in 1902; the latter was eventually settled via British mediation. Provisions in the dispute-ending treaty imposed restrictions on both countries' navies. The United Kingdom's Royal Navy bought the two Constitución-class pre-dreadnought battleships that were being built for Chile, and Argentina sold its two Rivadavia-class armored cruisers under construction in Italy to Japan.

After HMS Dreadnought was commissioned, Brazil decided in early 1907 to halt three obsolescent pre-dreadnoughts which were under construction in favor of two or three dreadnoughts. These ships, which were designed to carry the heaviest battleship armament in the world at the time, came as an abrupt shock to the navies of South America, and Argentina and Chile quickly canceled the 1902 armament-limiting pact. Argentina in particular was alarmed at the possible power of the ships. The Minister of Foreign Affairs, Manuel Augusto Montes de Oca, remarked that even one Minas Geraes-class ship could destroy the entire Argentine and Chilean fleets. While this may have been hyperbole, either one was much more powerful than any single vessel in the Argentine fleet. Although debates raged in Argentina over whether it would be prudent to counter Brazil's purchase by acquiring their own dreadnoughts, which would cost upwards of two million pounds sterling, further border disputes—particularly near the River Plate with Brazil—decided the matter, and they ordered Rivadavia and Moreno from the Fore River Shipbuilding Company in the United States.

== Construction and trials ==
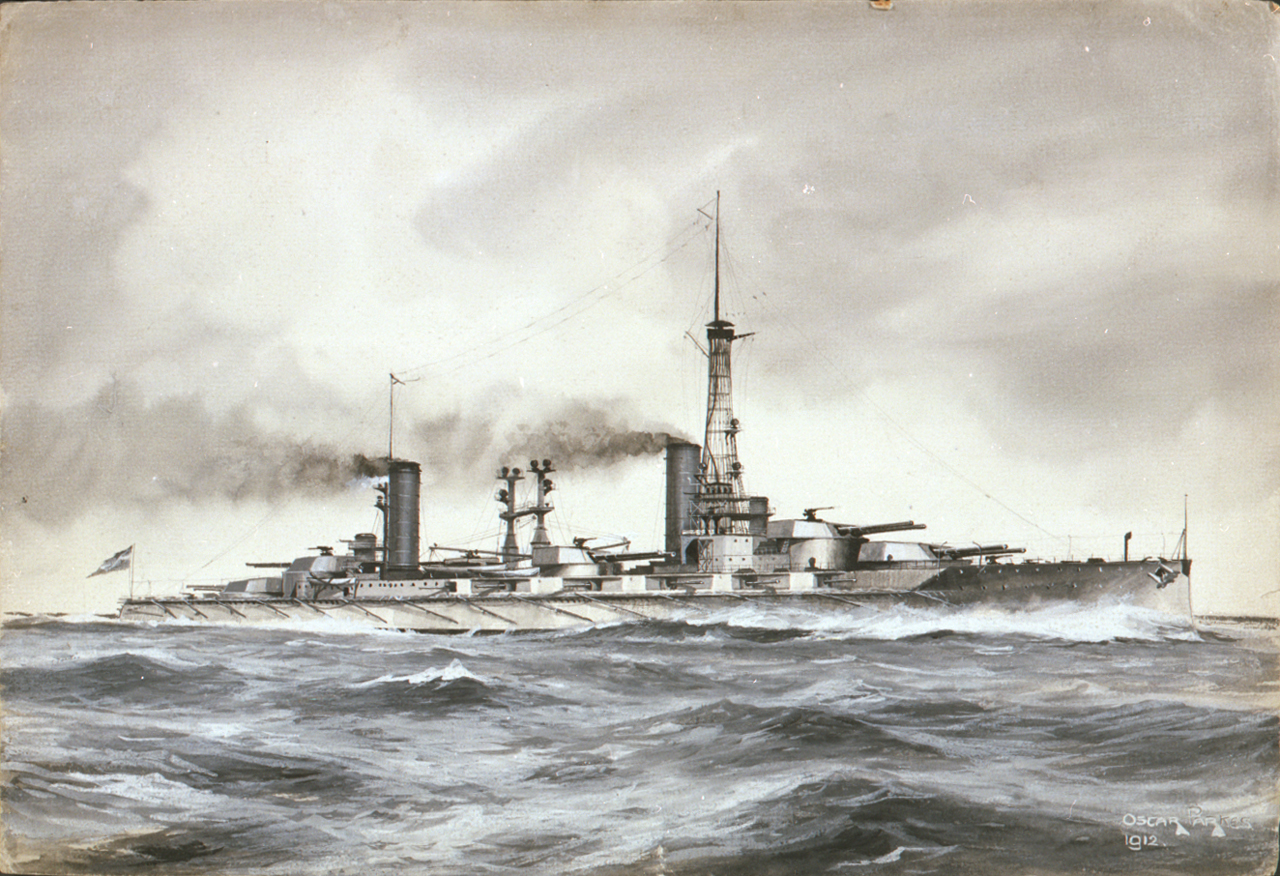
Illustration of Moreno by Oscar Parkes, 1912

After the two new dreadnoughts were awarded to Fore River, Moreno was subcontracted out to the New York Shipbuilding Corporation of Camden, New Jersey as called for in the final contract. Moreno's keel was laid on 9 July 1910, and construction was overseen by the Argentine Naval Commission. After the completion of the hull, it was launched on 23 September 1911. Isabel Betbeder, wife to the chief of the Argentine Naval Commission, sponsored Moreno. The ship was then moored to a dock to commence fitting-out. It was reported in January 1913 that apart from the usual naval requirements for Moreno and her sister ship ARA Rivadavia, two Victrola phonographs apiece were included as part of the official specifications. Moreno was finished on 15 February 1915, and commissioned into the Argentine Navy nine days later.

Over the course of their construction, Rivadavia and Moreno were the subject of various rumors insinuating that Argentina would accept the ships and then sell them to a European country or Japan, a fast-growing rival to the United States. The rumors were partially true; Argentina was looking to get rid of the battleships and devote the proceeds to opening more schools. This angered the American government, which did not want its warship technology offered to the highest bidder—yet they did not want to exercise a contract-specified option that gave the United States first choice if the Argentines decided to sell, as naval technology had already progressed past the Rivadavias, particularly in the adoption of the "all-or-nothing" armor scheme. Instead, the United States and its State Department and Navy Department put diplomatic pressure on the Argentine government.

The Argentine government, bolstered by socialist additions in the legislature, introduced several bills in May 1914 which would have put the battleships up for sale, but the bills were all defeated by late June. Following the commencement of the First World War, the German and British ambassadors to the United States both complained to the US State Department; the former believed that the British were going to be given the ships as soon as they reached Argentina, and the latter charged the United States with ensuring that the ships fell into Argentina's possession only. International armament companies attempted to influence Argentina into selling them to one of the smaller Balkan countries, from which they would find their way into the war. (Note: The specific example given in Livermore, footnote 106, is that a "group of French bankers, on behalf of the Russian government, were offering in gold twice the contract price of the ships, which were to be turned over to Greece." Turning over the ships was likely meant as a way around the United States' neutrality rules.)

In October 1914, Moreno sailed the New York Naval Shipyard to be painted, then conducted its sea trials starting on the 25th. Reporters for several newspapers, including The New York Times, and American naval officers were allowed on board during this time; the Times reporters gave a glowing account of the alcohol-serving café on the ship, calling it "the cutest little bar on any of the seven seas"—alcohol was banned on U.S. Navy ships.

The trials were plagued with serious engine trouble, culminating in the failure of an entire turbine on 2 November. Moreno was forced to put in at Rockland, Maine—where many of the observers on board were left to be brought back by train to Camden—before proceeding for repairs to the Fore River Shipyard, which had built the ship's engines.

In early 1915, nearly five years after construction had begun, the shipbuilding contractors demanded payment from the Argentine government for additional work, but the Argentines did not believe this was warranted, as Moreno had been scheduled to be completed more than a year prior. After mediation offered by Franklin D. Roosevelt, the Assistant Secretary of the Navy at the time, Moreno was released on 20 February to Argentine sailors who had been staying in American battleships moored in the Philadelphia Navy Yard.

Even Moreno's departure was marked by mishaps. On the night of 26 March, Moreno accidentally rammed and sank the barge Enterprise in the Delaware River, 30 miles (48 km) south of Philadelphia near the city of New Castle. No one was hurt, but the battleship accidentally ran aground immediately after. Efforts to refloat it succeeded, and Moreno continued on its way at around 7:30 the next morning without damage. On the 29th, President Woodrow Wilson was hosted for lunch on board the warship, accompanied by the Argentine ambassador to the United States, Romulo S. Naon. On 15 April, Moreno ran aground in the river again, this time near Reedy Island. Like the previous time, the ship was not damaged and tugs were able to refloat the ship the next day.

== Service ==
Moreno docked in Argentina for the first time on 26 May 1915. (Note: Whitley notes that the gap in between the completion and arrival dates was partly filled by Moreno being "diverted to attend the ceremonies marking the opening of the Panama Canal and an international [naval] review in Hampton Roads, [Virginia]," but a related New York Times article does not name Moreno as a participant in the latter.) The ship was immediately assigned to the Argentine Navy's First Division, based out of the major naval base of Puerto Belgrano, and remained there until 1923 when it was put into the reserve fleet. In 1924, Moreno was sent to the United States for modernization. The opportunity to show the flag was not missed; Moreno made stops in Valparaíso and Callao before transiting the Panama Canal and sailing north.

Most of the work was done in Philadelphia, though armament changes were made in Boston. Moreno was converted to use fuel oil instead of coal, was fitted with a new fire-control system, rangefinders were added to the fore and aft superfiring turrets, and the aft mast was replaced by a tripod. To reduce exhaust interference when spotting ships in a battle, a funnel cap was installed. The main armament's range was increased from 13,120 yards (12,000 m) to 20,800 yards (19,000 m), and the turrets were modified to double the firing rate. The 6-inch secondary armament was retained, but the smaller 4-inch guns were taken off in favor of four 3-inch (76 mm) anti-aircraft guns and four 3-pounders.

When Moreno returned to Argentina in August 1926, it was initially assigned to the training division of the Navy before being reassigned to the First Division. In 1932, Moreno was moved into a new Battleship Division with Rivadavia. The remainder of the 1930s was filled with diplomatic cruises. Moreno, escorted by the three Mendoza-class destroyers, brought Argentine president Agustín Pedro Justo to Brazil in 1933 for a major diplomatic visit. Departing in the afternoon of 2 October, he arrived in Rio de Janeiro on the morning of 7 October to huge celebrations. Brazilian ships of the first and second squadrons, along with three squadrons worth of warplanes, met Moreno at sea and escorted it to the harbor. When Justo landed and traveled by car to Guanabara Palace, the road was flanked by a plethora of army and naval forces along with thousands of citizens. Rio was described as "ablaze with light", and a 95-foot (29 m) high imitation of France's Arc de Triomphe was erected, onto which various colors were projected. Justo then took a royal train, originally designed for Albert I of Belgium's use during Brazil's 1922 centennial celebrations, to São Paulo. After three days, he traveled to Santos, where he boarded Moreno to travel first to Uruguay, then back to Argentina; he arrived in the latter on 22 October.

In 1934, Moreno was sent as one of Argentina's representatives for the anniversary of Brazil's independence. In 1937, Rivadavia and Moreno were sent on a diplomatic cruise to Europe. Departing Argentina on 6 April, they split up when they reached the English Channel. Moreno participated in the British Spithead Naval Review, where The New York Times described it as "a strange vestigial sea monster in this company of more modern fighting ships." Afterward, Moreno met up with Rivadavia at Brest, France and cruised together to Wilhelmshaven before splitting up again; Moreno went to Bremen, while Rivadavia put in at Hamburg. They then sailed for home and arrived in Puerto Belgrano on 29 June.

In September 1939, Moreno and Rivadavia traveled together to Brazil with naval cadets. However, before they could return, four Buenos Aires-class destroyers had to be sent to escort the ships back, as the Second World War had erupted in Europe. Since Argentina remained neutral in the war, Moreno saw little active service. By 1949, the venerable dreadnought had been decommissioned into reserve and was used as a barracks. In 1955, Moreno was used as a prison ship during the Liberating Revolution (Revolución Libertadora). The ship was stricken from the navy list on 1 October 1956; on 11 January 1957, Argentina sold Moreno for scrap for $2,468,660 to the Japanese Yawata Iron and Steel Company. On 12 May, the Argentine fleet assembled to salute the battleship one last time as it was towed out by the Dutch-owned ocean tugs Clyde and Ocean. Moreno was taken through the Panama Canal to the scrappers, arriving on 17 August. (Note: At 96 days, the tow set a world record for the longest-lasting tow ever accomplished, though it has since been surpassed.)
