= Wyoming-class battleship =

Dreadnought battleship class of the United States Navy

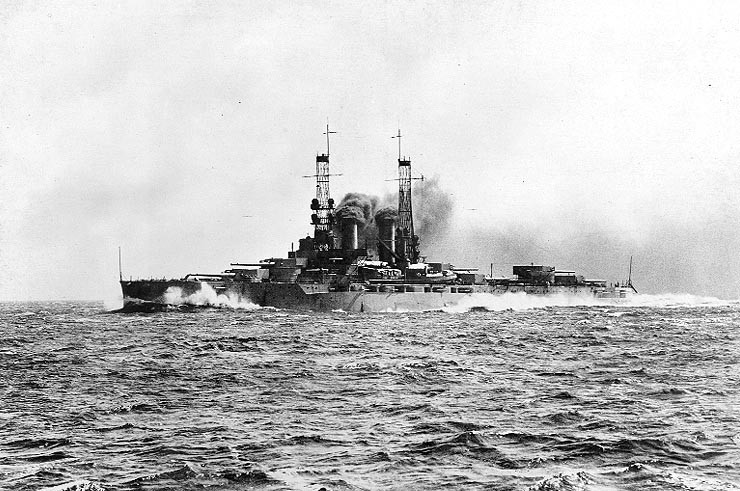
- Wyoming as completed

Class overview
- Name: Wyoming-class battleship
- Builders: William Cramp & Sons; New York Shipbuilding Corporation
- Operators: United States Navy
- Preceded by: Florida class
- Succeeded by: New York class
- Built: 1910–1912
- In commission: 1912–1947
- Completed: 2
- Retired: 2

General characteristics (As built) (Note: Many of these figures changed dramatically during the careers of the ships.)
- Type: Dreadnought battleship
- Displacement: Normal: 26,000 long tons (26,000 t); Full load: 27,243 long tons (27,680 t)
- Length: 562 ft (171 m) (overall); 554 ft (169 m) (waterline)
- Beam: 93 ft 3 in (28.42 m)
- Draft: 28 ft 6 in (8.69 m) (mean); 29 ft 7 in (9.02 m) (max)
- Installed power: 12 × coal-fired superheating Babcock & Wilcox water-tube boilers; 28,000 shp (20,880 kW)
- Propulsion: 4 × Parsons steam turbines; 4 × screws
- Speed: 20.5 kn (38.0 km/h; 23.6 mph)
- Range: 8,000 nmi (9,210 mi; 14,820 km) at 10 kn (19 km/h; 12 mph)
- Complement: 1,063 officers and enlisted
- Armament: 12 × 12 in (305 mm)/50 caliber Mark 7 guns; 21 × 5 in (127 mm)/51 cal guns; 4 × 3-pounder 47 mm (1.85 in)/40 cal saluting guns; 2 × 21 in (533 mm) torpedo tubes (submerged)
- Armor: Belt: 5–11 in (127–279 mm); Turret face: 12 in (305 mm); Barbettes: 11 in; Conning tower: 11.5 in (292 mm); Decks: 1.5–2.5 in (38–64 mm)

The Wyoming class was a pair of dreadnought battleships built for the United States Navy. Wyoming and Arkansas were authorized in early 1909, and were built between 1910 and 1912. These were the fourth dreadnought design of the US Navy, but only an incremental improvement over the preceding Florida class, and the last US battleships to use 12-inch guns. The primary changes were the adoption of a more powerful 12 in (305 mm)/50 caliber Mark 7 gun, addition of a sixth twin-gun turret and improved armor protection, including the first use of a torpedo bulkhead on American battleships. The Navy considered using more powerful 14-inch (356 mm) guns, but this would have caused delays and required larger docks.

The two ships frequently served together, first in the Atlantic Fleet in the 1910s. Both vessels were deployed to British waters after the United States entered World War I in April 1917 to reinforce the Royal Navy's Grand Fleet. They served in the Pacific Fleet in 1919–21, before both returned to the Atlantic Fleet. Much of their time in the Atlantic Fleet was spent conducting peacetime training exercises, along with taking midshipmen from the US Naval Academy on training cruises. Wyoming and Arkansas were heavily modernized in the mid-1920s, receiving more efficient oil-fired boilers to replace their old coal-fired models, thicker deck armor to protect against plunging fire, anti-torpedo bulges to increase their resistance to underwater damage, and anti-aircraft guns to defend against aerial attacks.

The London Naval Treaty of 1930 mandated that Wyoming be demilitarized; she accordingly was converted into a training ship, with half of her main battery turrets, belt armor, and anti-torpedo bulges removed. However, Arkansas was permitted to continue in service with the fleet. After the United States entered World War II, Arkansas was used to escort convoys to North Africa. By 1944, she served as a coastal bombardment vessel; in this role, she supported Allied landings at Normandy (Operation Overlord) and southern France (Operation Dragoon) before being transferred to the Pacific, where she provided fire support to Marines fighting on Iwo Jima and at Okinawa in 1945. Wyoming meanwhile continued as a training ship, being modified further in 1944 to include the various types of anti-aircraft guns that trainees would operate in the fleet. Both ships were decommissioned shortly after the war, with Arkansas being expended as a target ship during the 1946 nuclear tests at Operation Crossroads, and Wyoming being sold for scrap in 1947.

== Design ==
On 22 July 1908, the Newport Conference was held; this included the General Board, the staff of the Naval War College, President Theodore Roosevelt—who had a keen interest in naval matters—and other officers. This conference examined a series of issues relating to existing battleships and new designs; the first of these new ships would become the Wyoming class. The Board on Construction received general instructions from the Newport Conference; those at the conference favored adopting the 14-inch gun, as the British Royal Navy had already traded their 12-inch guns for 13.5-inch (343 mm) pieces. The Bureau of Ordnance (BuOrd) estimated that design work on the new gun, production, and testing would take two years. On 26 August, the Secretary of the Navy, Victor Metcalf, issued a request for eight- and ten-gun battleships armed with the 14-inch weapons to the Bureau of Construction and Repair (C&R). Speed was to be at least 20 kn (37 km/h; 23 mph), with as much armor as could be accommodated.

BuOrd argued that at likely battle ranges, 8,000 to 8,500 yd (7,300 to 7,800 m), the 12-inch gun was powerful enough to penetrate existing armor, and so the 14-inch gun was unnecessary. C&R produced three designs to meet Metcalf's request, all based on the preceding Florida design; the first, referred to as design 404, was a battleship armed with eight 14-inch guns. The second, design 502, had an additional twin turret for a total of ten 14-inch guns. The third, design 601, would be fitted with twelve 12-inch guns. The General Board chose 601, since the design work for the 14-inch gun had not begun, and adopting it would have caused the class to be delayed. In addition, the ships' displacement would have increased more dramatically with the larger gun, requiring extensive improvements to harbor facilities; design 502 would have only been able to dock in Pearl Harbor and Puget Sound with the existing facilities. The placement of the secondary battery also proved to be problematic. The cruise of the Great White Fleet in 1907–09 had demonstrated the problems with casemates on the main deck. They were too easily washed out in even moderate seas, making them unusable. Some officers at the Newport Conference had advocated placing them in the superstructure, but the heavy 5-inch (127 mm) guns used by the Navy would have added excessive top weight. Another alternative was to place them in the forecastle, but the additional weight forward would have strained the ship where the forecastle stepped down to the main deck. The designers ultimately settled on a full-length forecastle, which allowed the casemates to be moved about 4 ft (1.2 m) higher in the hull.

The ships' armor protection was improved over earlier designs. The belt and barbette armor was increased by an inch compared to an earlier version of the twelve-gun battleship. A new protection scheme for the funnels was devised, after the Russian experience at the Battle of Tsushima three years before had highlighted the risk of a destroyed exhaust system. The designers also emphasized the need for improved underwater protection. As a result, the Wyomings design incorporated a torpedo bulkhead, the first time the feature was included on an American battleship design. Congress approved two new battleships, BB-32 and BB-33, on 3 March 1909. Design 502 later proved to be the basis for the subsequent class of battleships, the New Yorks.

=== General characteristics and machinery ===
The ships of the Wyoming class were 554 ft (169 m) long at the waterline and 562 ft (171 m) long overall. They had a beam of 93 ft 3 in (28.42 m) and a draft of 28 ft 7 in (9 m). The ships displaced 26,000 long tons (26,417 t) as designed and up to 27,243 long tons (27,680 t) at full load. They had a full length flush deck, which improved sea-keeping and the ability to work the secondary guns in heavier seas. Both ships were fitted with lattice masts. Their transverse metacentric height was 5.4 ft (2 m). Freeboard was 25 ft (7.6 m) forward, 19 ft 2 in (5.84 m) amidships, 18 ft (5.5 m) at the aftmost turret, and 16 ft 3 in (4.95 m) at the stern. They had a crew of 58 officers and 1,005 enlisted men.

The ships were powered by four-shaft Parsons steam turbines rated at 28,000 shp (21,000 kW). Steam was provided by twelve mixed oil and coal-fired Babcock & Wilcox boilers, which were trunked into two closely spaced funnels amidships. The engines generated a top speed of 20.5 kn (38.0 km/h; 23.6 mph), though on speed trials Arkansas made 21.22 knots (39.30 km/h; 24.42 mph) from 25,546 shp (19,050 kW). Fuel capacity was 1,667 long tons (1,694 t) of coal and 266 long tons (270 t) of oil. This allowed the ships to cruise for 6,700 nmi (12,400 km; 7,700 mi) at a speed of 10 kn (19 km/h; 12 mph). At 20 kn (37 km/h; 23 mph), the range fell considerably, to 2,655 nmi (4,917 km; 3,055 mi). Steering was controlled by a single rudder.

=== Armament ===
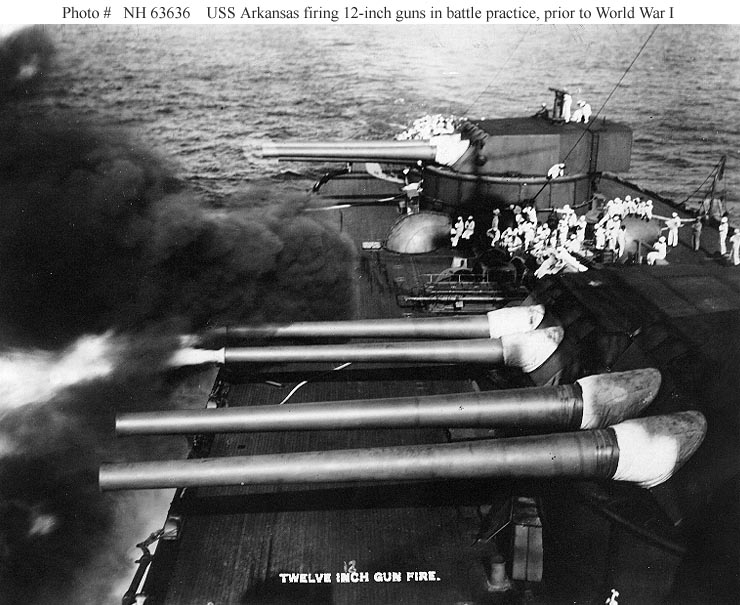
Arkansas's four aft turrets firing during gunnery practice

The ships were armed with a main battery of twelve 12-inch/50 caliber Mark 7 Mod 0 (Note: /50 refers to the length of the gun in terms of calibers. A /50 gun is 50 times long as it is in bore diameter.) guns in six Mark IX twin-gun turrets all on the centerline, two of which were placed in a superfiring pair forward. The other four turrets were placed aft of the superstructure in two superfiring pairs. These guns fired a 870 lb (395 kg) shell with a 353 lb (160 kg) propellant charge, which produced a muzzle velocity of 2,900 ft/s (880 m/s). Wyoming and Arkansas were the only ships of the US Navy to receive the gun; earlier dreadnoughts were equipped with the lower-velocity 12-inch/45-caliber Mark 5 gun. The Mark 7 had significantly better armor penetrating capabilities, owing to its higher muzzle velocity (and thus higher striking velocity). At a range of 12,000 yd (11,000 m), the gun could penetrate 12.3 in (310 mm) of contemporary face-hardened armor, compared to 10.8 in (270 mm) for the Mark 5. The guns were mounted in the Mark IX gun turret, which allowed for elevation to 15 degrees and depression to −5 degrees. Unlike the turrets used on earlier dreadnoughts, the Mark IX turret required the guns to return to 0 degrees to reload.

The secondary battery consisted of twenty-one 5-inch/51 caliber guns mounted in casemates along the side of the hull. These guns fired a 50 lb (23 kg) shell with a charge of 24.5 lb (11.1 kg), at a muzzle velocity of 3,150 ft/s (960 m/s). As was standard for capital ships of the period, they carried a pair of submerged 21-inch (530 mm) torpedo tubes in the hull on the broadside. They were equipped with the Mark III Bliss-Leavitt design, which carried a 218 lb (99 kg) warhead and had a range of 4,000 yd (3,700 m) at a speed of 26.5 kn (49.1 km/h; 30.5 mph).

=== Armor ===
The main armored belt, which was 8 ft (2.4 m) high, was 11 in (279 mm) thick over the central portion of the ship, where it protected the ammunition magazines and machinery spaces. The belt reduced to 5 in (130 mm) toward the stern. On the bottom edge it was reduced to 9 in (230 mm). The forward end of the belt was connected with an 11 in thick transverse bulkhead with the forward-most main battery barbette, while the aft end of the belt was connected with a 9 in bulkhead. The main armored deck was 2.5 in (64 mm) of special treatment steel, reduced to 1.5 in (38 mm) in less critical areas. The conning tower had 11.5 in (292 mm) thick sides and a 3 in (76 mm) thick roof.

The gun turrets had 12 in (305 mm) thick faces and 3 in thick roofs. Their supporting barbettes had 11 in thick sides where they were exposed; the portions that were masked by the armored belt were reduced to 4.5 in (110 mm). The lower half of the casemate armor was 11 in thick, and the upper half was reduced to 6.5 in (170 mm). Inboard of the casemate battery were longitudinal armored bulkheads; these were designed to protect the uptakes to the funnels. These were deemed important because during the Russo-Japanese War, three years before, Russian battleships had had their uptakes damaged, which ducted the boiler smoke into the ship rather than out through the funnels.

=== Modifications ===
Both ships were significantly modified throughout their careers. During and shortly after World War I, the horizontal armor of the ships was improved, including the roofs of the conning tower and the gun turrets. Their deck armor was increased to 3.5 in (89 mm), and eight 3-inch (76 mm)/50 caliber anti-aircraft guns were installed. Following the signing of the Washington Naval Treaty in February 1922, modernization work was strictly controlled. The treaty governed what modifications could be made to existing ships, and included restrictions on what could be changed or added. Displacement could rise by no more than 3,000 long tons (3,048 t) and no alterations of any kind could be made to the main battery guns or mounts. The primary areas that could be improved were those that concerned defense against aerial and underwater attack, along with propulsion systems.

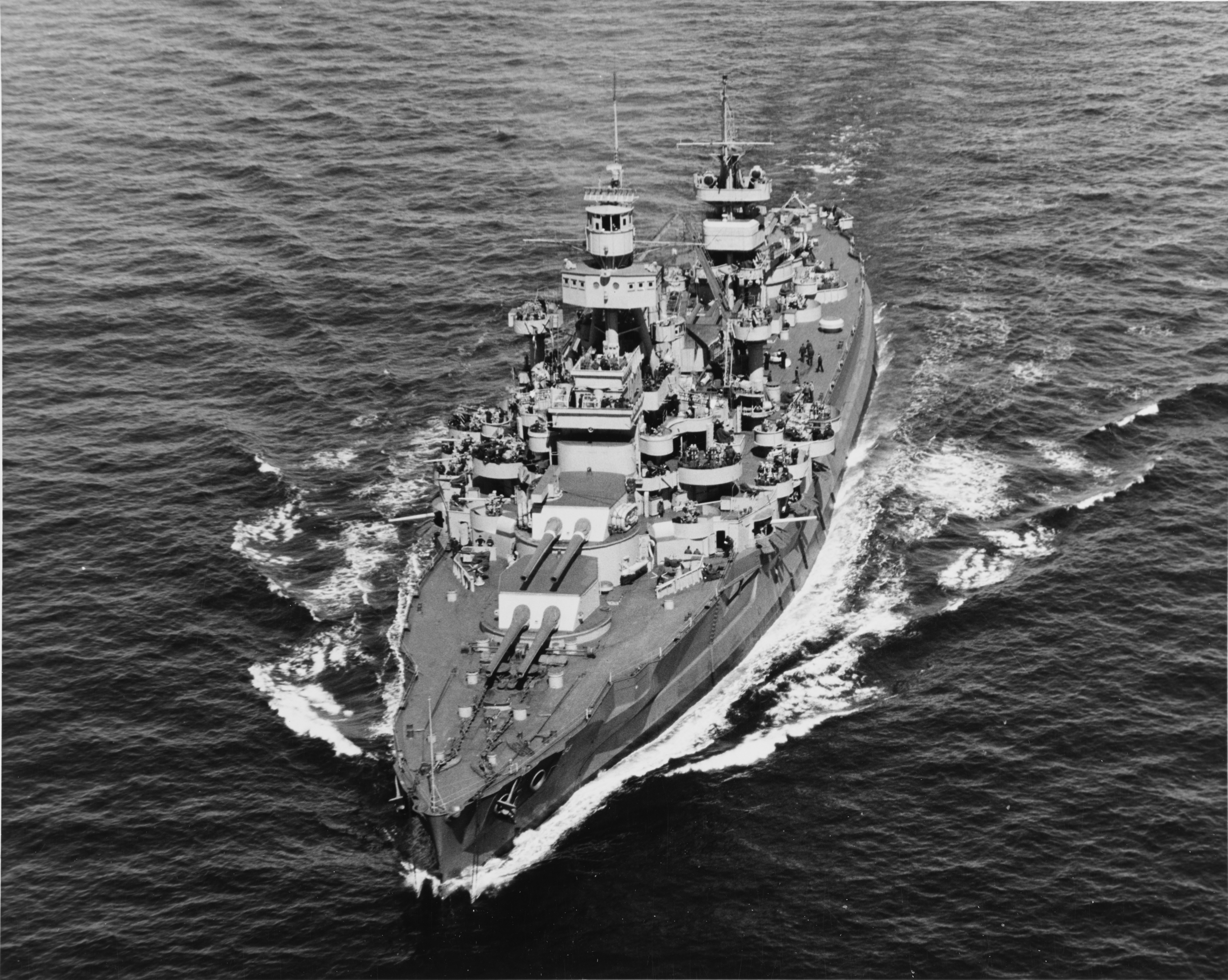
Arkansas in her 1944 configuration, with tripod foremast

The two Wyomings, along with the Floridas and New Yorks, were heavily modernized in the 1920s. All six ships were converted to completely oil-fired boilers with equipment taken from the cancelled South Dakota-class battleships. The boilers were trunked into a single funnel. These boilers were much more efficient than the coal-fired models the ships had been completed with, and they allowed a significantly greater cruising radius of 11,000 nmi (20,370 km; 12,660 mi). The ships were also fitted with anti-torpedo bulges, which improved their underwater defense and also provided additional oil storage capacity. Wyoming and Arkansas lost their cage main mast, which was replaced by a short tripod mast that carried searchlights and radio antennas. Some of their secondary battery guns were relocated higher in the ship to improve their workability in heavy seas. A sponson for six guns was built into the hull abreast of the conning tower and the eight 3-inch anti-aircraft guns were moved to the top of the sponson. Both ships had their torpedo tubes removed.

Under the terms of the 1930 London Naval Treaty, Wyoming was to be demilitarized and converted into a training ship. During the demilitarization process, her anti-torpedo bulges, side armor, and half of her main battery guns were removed. Wyoming was modernized at Norfolk Navy Yard from 12 January to 3 April 1944; the reconstruction removed the last of her three 12-inch gun turrets, and replaced them with four twin and two single enclosed mounts for 5-inch/38 caliber guns. New fire control radars were also installed; these modifications allowed Wyoming to train anti-aircraft gunners with the most modern equipment they would use while in combat with the fleet. Modifications to Arkansas during World War II were kept to a minimum. In 1942, Arkansas received a new tripod foremast and bridgework, along with more anti-aircraft guns throughout the war. By 1945, she carried nine quadruple 40 mm Bofors mounts and thirty-six 20 mm Oerlikons in two quadruple and twenty-eight single mounts, and the number of 3-inch guns had been increased to ten.

== Ships in class ==
Construction data
Ship name	Hull no.	Builder	Laid down	Launched	Commissioned	Decommissioned	Fate
Wyoming	BB-32	William Cramp & Sons	9 February 1910	25 May 1911	25 September 1912	1 August 1947	Struck 16 December 1947; Sold for scrap, 30 October 1947
Arkansas	BB-33	New York Shipbuilding Corporation	25 January 1910	14 January 1911	17 September 1912	29 July 1946	Struck 15 August 1946; Sunk on 25 July 1946, as part of Operation Crossroads

== Service history ==
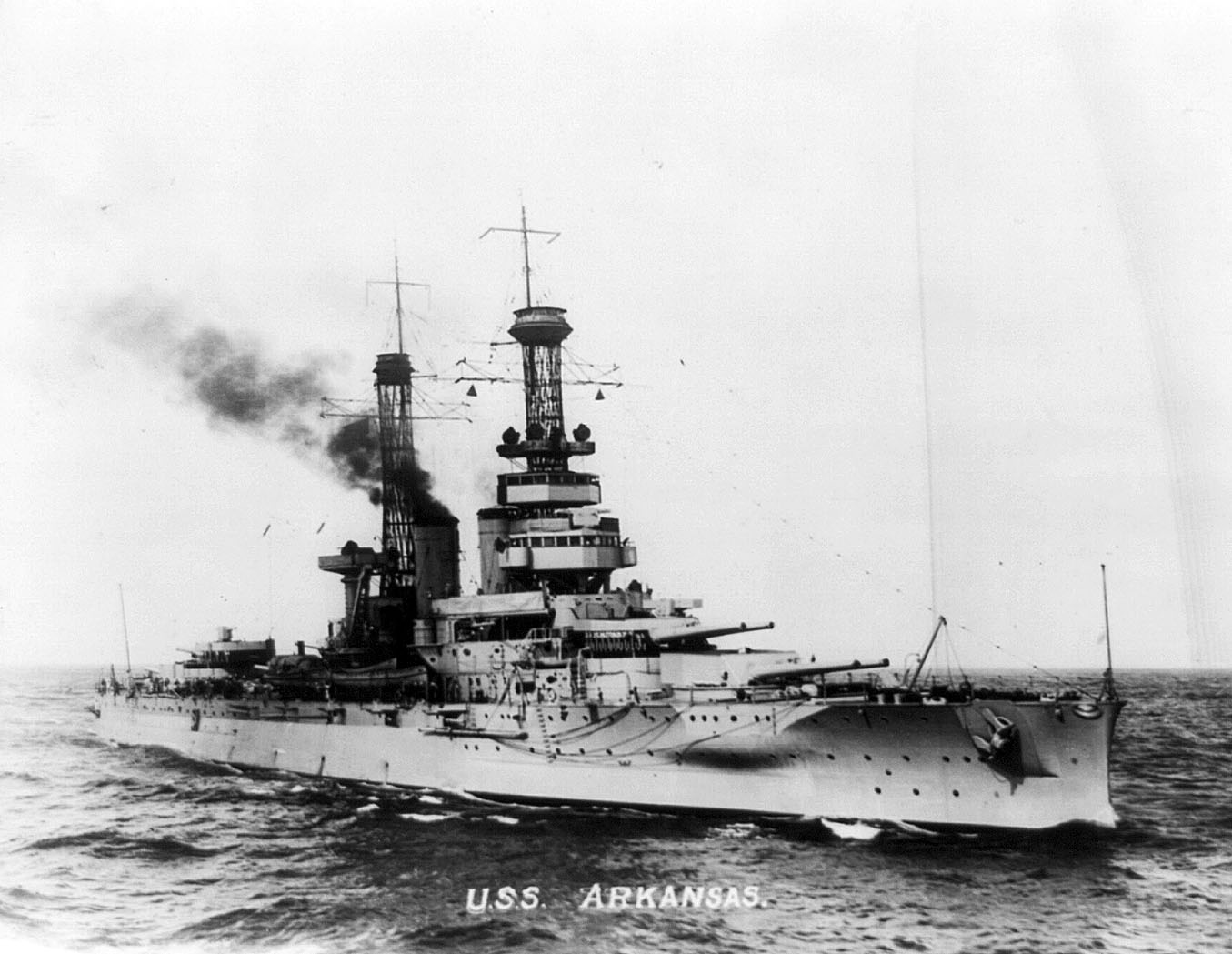
Arkansas underway in 1920

After entering service, both ships were assigned to the Atlantic Fleet. The ships took part in the normal routine of training and fleet maneuvers off the east coast of the United States and in the Caribbean, interspersed with periodic maintenance. Both ships toured the Mediterranean in late 1913, making stops in Italy and France, among others. In April 1914, Arkansas was involved in the occupation of Veracruz during the Mexican Revolution, and Wyoming arrived later to support the operation. Two men from Arkansas earned the Medal of Honor for their actions during the initial occupation of the city. After the United States declared war on Germany on 6 April 1917, Wyoming, along with the rest of Battleship Division 9 (BatDiv 9), steamed to Britain to reinforce the Royal Navy's Grand Fleet, stationed in Scapa Flow. Arkansas initially remained in the United States, training gun crews for the expanding wartime fleet. In July 1918, she too was sent to Britain. Neither ship saw action during the war, though they were present when the German High Seas Fleet surrendered in November 1918.

From mid-1919 to mid-1921, Arkansas and Wyoming served in the Pacific Fleet, with the latter serving as the flagship of BatDiv 6. During this time, the ships made a tour of Central and South American countries, culminating in a visit to Valparaíso, Chile, where they took part in a naval review for the Chilean president. Both battleships returned in service with the Atlantic Fleet in mid-1921. They returned to their peacetime routine of training and maneuvers and periodic maintenance. In the summers, the ships would generally take midshipmen from the US Naval Academy on training cruises. In June 1925, Arkansas assisted relief efforts after the 1925 Santa Barbara earthquake. From late 1925 to late 1926, Arkansas received her reconstruction, followed by Wyoming in 1927. In 1929 and 1930, Arkansas visited European waters on midshipmen cruises; she made stops in several countries. Wyoming was reduced to a training ship in 1931 in accordance with the London Naval Treaty, and she spent the next decade conducting training cruises for midshipmen and NROTC cadets.

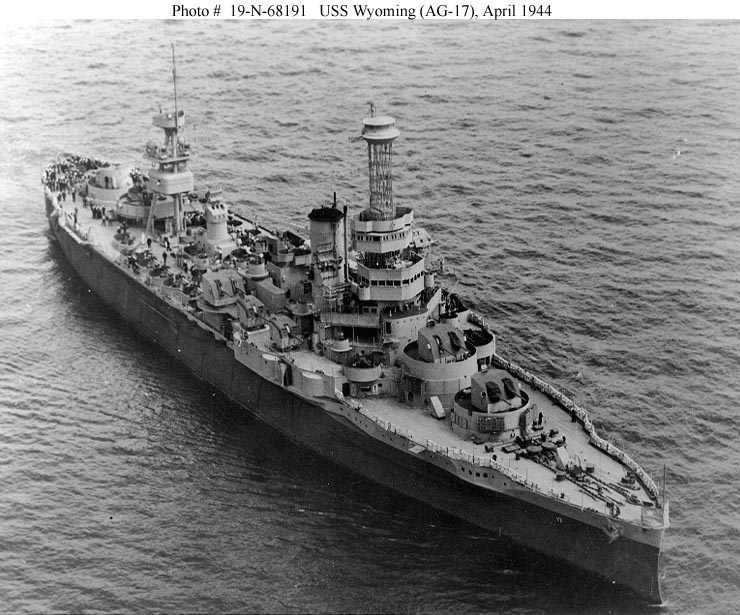
Wyoming after conversion to a gunnery training ship

From early 1932 to early 1934, Arkansas returned for another stint in the Pacific Fleet, followed by another tour of Europe later in the year. After the outbreak of World War II in September 1939, she was assigned to the reserve force for the Neutrality Patrols. She supported the replacement of Canadian troops by American ones maintaining the occupation of Iceland in July 1941 as an escort for the troopship convoys. In November, as it became increasingly apparent that the United States would become involved in World War II, Wyoming was reassigned as a gunnery training ship, a role she served in for the duration of the war. Arkansas, meanwhile, continued in front-line service during the war, first as an escort to convoys to North Africa, and then as a shore bombardment vessel. She supported the landings at Normandy in June 1944, shelling German positions at Omaha Beach, before bombarding Cherbourg later in the month. Her next bombardment mission came with Operation Dragoon, the invasion of southern France, in August that year. She was then transferred to the Pacific Theater of Operations for action against the Japanese. She bombarded Japanese positions on Iwo Jima in February 1945 and on Okinawa in April.

With the end of the war in September 1945, Arkansas was employed with Operation Magic Carpet, repatriating American soldiers in the Pacific. Wyoming remained in service briefly after the war, though she was decommissioned in August 1947. She was sold for scrap in October and subsequently broken up. Arkansas was instead retained for use as a target ship during the Operation Crossroads nuclear tests in mid-1946. She survived the first test, an air-burst code-named ABLE, though the second experiment, an underwater detonation code-named BAKER, sank the ship.
