= List of battleships of World War II =

This is a list of battleships of the Second World War. All displacements are at standard load, in metric tonnes, so as to avoid confusion over their relative displacements. [Note: Not all displacements have been adjusted to match this yet]. Ideally displacements will be as they were at either the end of the war, or when the ship was sunk.

The battleship was a capital ship built in the first half of the 20th century. At the outbreak of war, large fleets of battleships—many inherited from the dreadnought era decades before—were considered one of the decisive forces in naval warfare. There were two engagements between battleships in the Pacific theatre and three in the Atlantic theatre. Battleships were the most heavily protected ships afloat, nonetheless sixteen were sunk or crippled by bombs or torpedoes delivered by aircraft, while three more were sunk by submarine-launched torpedoes. Guided bombs developed during the war made it much easier for aircraft to sink battleships. By the end of the war, battleship construction was all but halted, and almost every existing battleship was retired or scrapped within a few years of its end. The Second World War saw the end of the battleship as the dominant force in the world's navies.

The List of ships of World War II contains major military vessels of the war, arranged alphabetically and by type. The list includes armed vessels that served during the war and in the immediate aftermath, inclusive of localized ongoing combat operations, garrison surrenders, post-surrender occupation, colony re-occupation, troop and prisoner repatriation, to the end of 1945. For smaller vessels, see also List of World War II ships of less than 1000 tons.

List of battleships of World War II
Ship	Operator	Class	Type	Displacement (tons)	First commissioned	End of service	Fate
Alabama	United States Navy	South Dakota	fast battleship	35,980	16 August 1942	9 January 1947	Decommissioned 9 January 1947; museum ship
Almirante Latorre	Chilean Navy	Almirante Latorre	super-dreadnought	28,550	1 August 1920	1 October 1958	Scrapped 1959
Andrea Doria	Regia Marina	Andrea Doria	fast battleship	25,920	13 March 1916	16 September 1956	Scrapped 1956
Anson	Royal Navy	King George V	fast battleship	39,100	22 June 1942	1 November 1951	Scrapped 1957
Arizona	United States Navy	Pennsylvania	super-dreadnought	31,900	17 October 1916	7 December 1941	Sunk 7 December 1941; war memorial
Arkansas	United States Navy	Wyoming	dreadnought	26,100	17 September 1912	25 July 1946	Sunk 25 July 1946 in A-bomb test
Asahi	Imperial Japanese Navy		pre-dreadnought	11,625	28 April 1900	26 May 1942	Sunk 25/26 May 1942
Barham	Royal Navy	Queen Elizabeth	super-dreadnought	31,000	19 August 1915	25 November 1941	Sunk 25 November 1941
Bismarck	Kriegsmarine	Bismarck	fast battleship	41,700	24 August 1940	27 May 1941	Sunk 27 May 1941
Bretagne	French Navy	Bretagne	super-dreadnought	22,200	10 February 1916	3 July 1940	Sunk 3 July 1940
California	United States Navy	Tennessee	super-dreadnought	32,300	10 August 1921	14 February 1947	Decommissioned 14 February 1947, scrapped 1959
Centurion	Royal Navy	King George V	super-dreadnought	25,500	22 May 1913	7 June 1944	Scuttled as a Mulberry harbour breakwater off Normandy, 7 June 1944
Colorado	United States Navy	Colorado	super-dreadnought	33,100	30 August 1923	23 July 1959	Sold for scrap, 23 July 1959
Condorcet	French Navy	Danton	semi-dreadnought	18,458	25 July 1911	July 1941	Scuttled by Germany August 1944, scrapped 1949
Conte di Cavour	Regia Marina	Conte di Cavour	fast battleship	26,140	1 April 1915	11 November 1940	Deliberately run aground November 1940, scrapped 1946
Courbet	French Navy; Free French Naval Forces	Courbet	dreadnought	23,200	19 November 1913	1 January 1941	Scuttled as a "Gooseberry" breakwater 6 June 1944
Duilio	Regia Marina	Andrea Doria	fast battleship	25,920	10 May 1915	15 September 1956	Scrapped 1957
Duke of York	Royal Navy	King George V	fast battleship	39,100	28 February 1940	1 November 1951	Scrapped 1957
Dunkerque	French Navy	Dunkerque	fast battleship	26,500	15 April 1937	1 March 1942	Scuttled 27 November 1942
Fusō	Imperial Japanese Navy	Fusō	super-dreadnought	34,700	18 November 1915	25 October 1944	Sunk 25 October 1944
Giulio Cesare	Regia Marina	Conte di Cavour	fast battleship	26,140	10 May 1914	29 October 1955	Ceded to Soviet Union 1948, renamed Novorossiysk, sunk by abandoned mine
Gneisenau	Kriegsmarine	Scharnhorst	fast battleship	32,000	21 May 1938	1 July 1942	Sunk as block ship March 1945
Haruna	Imperial Japanese Navy	Kongō	fast battleship	37,187	19 April 1915	28 July 1945	Sunk at her moorings on 28 July 1945, raised and scrapped in 1946
Hessen	Kriegsmarine	Braunschweig	pre-dreadnought	13,208	19 September 1905		Ceded to USSR as Tsel 2 January 1946, scrapped 1960
Hiei	Imperial Japanese Navy	Kongō	fast battleship	37,187	21 November 1912	13 November 1942	Sunk following the Naval Battle of Guadalcanal on 13 November 1942
Hood	Royal Navy	Admiral	battlecruiser	43,350	15 May 1920	24 May 1941	Sunk 24 May 1941
Howe	Royal Navy	King George V	fast battleship	39,100	28 September 1942	1 January 1951	Scrapped 1958
Hyūga	Imperial Japanese Navy	Ise	super-dreadnought	35,560	30 April 1918	28 July 1945	Sunk 28 July 1945
Idaho	United States Navy	New Mexico	super-dreadnought	32,514	24 March 1919	3 July 1946	Broken up at Newark, 1947
Impero	Regia Marina	Littorio	fast battleship	40,992			Launched during war 15 November 1939, broken up at Venice, 1948 to 1950
Indiana	United States Navy	South Dakota	fast battleship	35,980	30 April 1942	15 November 1945	Decommissioned 11 September 1947, scrapped 1963
Iowa	United States Navy	Iowa	fast battleship	55,770	22 February 1943	26 October 1990	Decommissioned 1990; museum ship
Iron Duke	Royal Navy	Iron Duke	super-dreadnought	25,400	1 March 1914	17 October 1939	Paid off March 1946
Ise	Imperial Japanese Navy	Ise	super-dreadnought	35,560	15 December 1917	1 March 1945	Sunk 28 July 1945
Jean Bart	French Navy	Richelieu	fast battleship	37,850	16 January 1949	1 August 1957	Launched during war 6 March 1940, Scrapped 24 June 1970
Kilkis	Hellenic Navy	Mississippi	pre-dreadnought	13,209	1 February 1908	23 April 1941	Sunk 23 April 1941, wreck was refloated and scrapped 1950s
King George V	Royal Navy	King George V	fast battleship	39,100	11 December 1940	1 June 1950	Scrapped 1957
Kirishima	Imperial Japanese Navy	Kongō	fast battleship	37,187	19 April 1915	15 November 1942	Sunk 15 November 1942
Kongō	Imperial Japanese Navy	Kongō	fast battleship	37,187	18 May 1912	21 November 1944	Sunk by USS Sealion in the Formosa Strait, 21 November 1944
Lemnos	Hellenic Navy	Mississippi	pre-dreadnought	13,209	1 April 1908	23 April 1941	Sunk 23 April 1941, wreck was refloated and scrapped 1950s
Littorio	Regia Marina	Littorio	fast battleship	40,724	6 May 1940	1 June 1948	Renamed Italia 30 July 1943, scrapped 1948
Lorraine	French Navy; Free French Naval Forces	Bretagne	super-dreadnought	22,200	27 July 1916	17 February 1953	Scrapped January 1954
Malaya	Royal Navy	Queen Elizabeth	super-dreadnought	31,000	1 February 1916	1 December 1944	Scrapped 1948
Marat	Soviet Navy	Gangut	dreadnought	23,000	5 January 1915	4 September 1953	Sunk 23 September 1941, later rear part refloated, renamed Petropavlovsk 31 May 1943, scrapped September 1953
Maryland	United States Navy	Colorado	super-dreadnought	33,100	21 July 1921	3 April 1947	Sold for scrap 8 July 1959
Massachusetts	United States Navy	South Dakota	fast battleship	35,980	12 May 1942	27 March 1947	Museum ship 14 August 1965
Minas Geraes	Brazilian Navy	Minas Geraes	dreadnought	19,200	18 April 1910	16 May 1952	Scrapped 1954
Mississippi	United States Navy	New Mexico	super-dreadnought	32,514	25 January 1917	17 September 1956	Scrapped 1957
Missouri	United States Navy	Iowa	fast battleship	55,770	11 June 1944	31 March 1992	Museum ship 29 January 1999
Moreno	Argentine Navy	Rivadavia	dreadnought	27,720	26 February 1915	1 October 1956	Sold for scrap 11 January 1957
Musashi	Imperial Japanese Navy	Yamato	fast battleship	65,000	5 August 1942	25 October 1944	Sunk 25 October 1944
Mutsu	Imperial Japanese Navy	Nagato	super-dreadnought	32,720	24 October 1921	8 June 1943	Sunk in harbor by internal explosion 8 June 1943
Nagato	Imperial Japanese Navy	Nagato	super-dreadnought	32,720	25 November 1920	15 September 1945	Sunk as target 29 July 1946
Nelson	Royal Navy	Nelson	treaty battleship	34,000	10 September 1927	20 October 1947	Decommissioned February 1948, scrapped March 1949
Nevada	United States Navy	Nevada	super-dreadnought	29,000	11 March 1916	29 August 1946	Sunk as a target 31 July 1948
New Jersey	United States Navy	Iowa	fast battleship	55,770	23 May 1943	8 February 1991	Museum ship 15 October 2001
New Mexico	United States Navy	New Mexico	super-dreadnought	32,514	20 May 1918	19 July 1946	Scrapped November 1947
New York	United States Navy	New York	super-dreadnought	27,000	15 May 1914	29 August 1946	Sunk as target 6 July 1948
North Carolina	United States Navy	North Carolina	fast battleship	37,200	9 April 1941	27 June 1947	Museum ship 29 April 1962
Océan	French Navy	Courbet	dreadnought	23,475	5 June 1913		Captured by Germany 27 November 1942, sunk 1944, scrapped 14 December 1945
Oklahoma	United States Navy	Nevada	super-dreadnought	29,000	2 May 1916	1 September 1944	Sunk 7 December 1941, raised and sunk under tow 1947
Oktyabrskaya Revolutsiya	Soviet Navy	Gangut	dreadnought	23,000	3 June 1909	17 February 1956	Scrapped 1959
Paris	French Navy; Royal Navy	Courbet	dreadnought	23,475	5 June 1913	21 December 1955	Captured by Britain 3 July 1940 used as depot ship, scrapped 1956
Parizhskaya Kommuna	Soviet Navy	Gangut	dreadnought	23,000	30 November 1914	17 February 1956	Renamed Sevastopol 31 May 1943, scrapped 1956–1957
Pennsylvania	United States Navy	Pennsylvania	super-dreadnought	31,900	12 June 1916	29 August 1946	Decommissioned 29 August 1946, sunk as target 10 February 1948
Prince of Wales	Royal Navy	King George V	fast battleship	37,300	31 March 1941	10 December 1941	Sunk 10 December 1941
Provence	French Navy	Bretagne	super-dreadnought	22,200	1 March 1916	27 November 1942	Scuttled 27 November 1942
Queen Elizabeth	Royal Navy	Queen Elizabeth	super-dreadnought	31,000	22 December 1914	15 May 1948	Decommissioned and scrapped 1948
Ramillies	Royal Navy	Revenge	super-dreadnought	29,150	1 September 1917	31 August 1945	Decommissioned 31 August 1945, scrapped 1949
Renown	Royal Navy	Renown	battlecruiser	31,242	20 September 1916	1 June 1948	Scrapped 1948
Repulse	Royal Navy	Renown	battlecruiser	31,242	18 August 1916	10 December 1941	Sunk 10 December 1941
Resolution	Royal Navy	Revenge	super-dreadnought	29,150	7 December 1916	February 1948	Scrapped 1949
Revenge	Royal Navy	Revenge	super-dreadnought	29,150	1 February 1916	March 1948	Scrapped 1948
Richelieu	French Navy; Free French Naval Forces	Richelieu	fast battleship	37,850	15 July 1940	30 September 1967	Scrapped 1968
Rivadavia	Argentine Navy	Rivadavia	dreadnought	27,720	27 August 1914	1 February 1957	Sold for scrap 30 May 1957
Rodney	Royal Navy	Nelson	treaty battleship	34,000	10 November 1927		Scrapped 1948
Roma	Regia Marina	Littorio	fast battleship	40,992	14 June 1942	9 September 1943	Sunk 9 September 1943
Royal Oak	Royal Navy	Revenge	super-dreadnought	29,150	1 May 1916	14 October 1939	Sunk 14 October 1939
Royal Sovereign	Royal Navy; Soviet Navy	Revenge	super-dreadnought	29,150	1 February 1916	18 May 1949	Transferred to USSR as Arkhangelsk 30 May 1944, returned to UK 4 February 1949, scrapped 18 May 1949
São Paulo	Brazilian Navy	Minas Geraes	dreadnought	19,200	12 July 1910	2 August 1947	Sunk while under tow 4 November 1951
Scharnhorst	Kriegsmarine	Scharnhorst	fast battleship	32,000	7 January 1939	26 December 1943	Sunk 26 December 1943
Schlesien	Kriegsmarine	Deutschland	pre-dreadnought	14,218	5 May 1908	4 May 1945	Blown up 4 May 1945
Schleswig-Holstein	Kriegsmarine	Deutschland	pre-dreadnought	14,218	6 July 1908	25 January 1945	According to Polish sources expended as target in 1948 by Soviets; according to other sources: scrapped after 1946
Settsu	Imperial Japanese Navy	Kawachi	dreadnought	16,390	1 July 1912	29 July 1945	Scrapped 1946–1947
South Dakota	United States Navy	South Dakota	fast battleship	35,980	20 March 1942	31 January 1947	Decommissioned 31 January 1947, scrapped 1962
Sovetskaya Rossiya	Soviet Navy	Sovetsky Soyuz	fast battleship	65,150			Laid down 22 July 1940, 0.97% complete by the end of the war, scrapped 27 March 1947
Sovetskaya Ukraina	Soviet Navy	Sovetsky Soyuz	fast battleship	65,150			Laid down 31 October 1938, 17.98% complete by the start of the war, scrapped 27 March 1947
Sovetsky Soyuz	Soviet Navy	Sovetsky Soyuz	fast battleship	65,150			Laid down 15 July 1938, 21.19% complete by the start of the war, scrapped 29 May 1948
Strasbourg	French Navy	Dunkerque	fast battleship	26,500	15 March 1938	27 November 1942	Scuttled 27 November 1942
Tennessee	United States Navy	Tennessee	super-dreadnought	32,300	3 June 1920	14 February 1947	Decommissioned 14 February 1947, scrapped 1959
Texas	United States Navy	New York	super-dreadnought	27,000	12 March 1914	21 April 1948	Decommissioned 21 April 1948; museum ship
Tirpitz	Kriegsmarine	Bismarck	fast battleship	42,900	25 February 1941	12 November 1944	Sunk 12 November 1944
Turgut Reis	Turkish Navy	Brandenburg	pre-dreadnought	10,013	14 October 1894		Scrapped 1950–1957
Utah	United States Navy	Florida	dreadnought	22,175	31 August 1911	5 September 1944	Sunk 7 December 1941; war memorial
Valiant	Royal Navy	Queen Elizabeth	super-dreadnought	31,000	13 January 1916	1 July 1946	Scrapped 1950
Vanguard	Royal Navy		fast battleship	45,200	15 October 1946	9 October 1959	launch during war 30 November 1944, paid off 7 June 1960
Vittorio Veneto	Regia Marina	Littorio	fast battleship	40,517	28 April 1940	10 September 1943	Scrapped 1948
Warspite	Royal Navy	Queen Elizabeth	super-dreadnought	31,000	8 March 1915	1 February 1945	Scrapped 1950
Washington	United States Navy	North Carolina	fast battleship	37,200	15 May 1941	27 June 1947	Decommissioned 27 June 1947, scrapped 1960
West Virginia	United States Navy	Colorado	super-dreadnought	33,100	1 December 1923	9 January 1947	Decommissioned 9 January 1947, scrapped 1959
Wisconsin	United States Navy	Iowa	fast battleship	55,770	16 April 1944	30 September 1991	Decommissioned 30 September 1991; museum ship
Wyoming	United States Navy	Wyoming	dreadnought	26,000	25 September 1912	1 August 1947	Sold for scrap 30 October 1947
Yamashiro	Imperial Japanese Navy	Fusō	super-dreadnought	34,700	31 March 1917	25 October 1944	Sunk 25 October 1944
Yamato	Imperial Japanese Navy	Yamato	fast battleship	65,000	16 December 1941	7 April 1945	Sunk 7 April 1945
Yavuz	Turkish Navy	Moltke	battlecruiser	22,979	2 July 1912	20 December 1950	Decommissioned 20 December 1950, scrapped 1973
Zähringen	Kriegsmarine	Wittelsbach	pre-dreadnought	11,800	25 October 1902	18 December 1944	Scuttled 26 March 1945, scrapped 1949–1950

== See also ==
- List of battleships
- List of battleships of World War I
- List of coastal defence ships of World War II

== Bibliography ==
- "NavSource Naval History".
- Helgason, Guðmundur (1995–2007). "Allied Warships". Uboat.net.
- "Battleships-Cruisers.co.uk". Cranston Fine Arts. 2001–2007.
- Burr, Lawrence (2006). British Battlecruisers 1914–18. New Vanguard No. 126. Oxford: Osprey Publishing. ISBN 1-84603-008-0.
- Colledge, J. J.; Warlow, Ben (2006) [1969]. Ships of the Royal Navy: The Complete Record of All Fighting Ships of the Royal Navy from the 15th Century to the Present (3rd Rev ed.). London: Chatham Publishing. ISBN 978-1-86176-281-8. OCLC 67375475.
- Gray, Randal (1985). Gardiner, Robert (ed.). Conway's All the World's Fighting Ships 1906–1921. Naval Institute Press. p. 439. ISBN 978-0-87021-907-8.
- Gardiner, Robert, ed. (1980). Conway's All the World's Fighting Ships 1922–1946. Conway Maritime Press. ISBN 0-85177-146-7.
- Gibbons, Tony (1983). The Complete Encyclopedia of Battleships and Battlecruisers - A Technical Directory of all the World's Capital Ships from 1860 to the Present Day. London, UK: Salamander Books Ltd. p. 272. ISBN 0-517-37810-8.
- Ireland, Bernard; Grove, Eric (1997). Jane's War At Sea 1897–1997. London, UK: Harper Collins Publishers. p. 256. ISBN 0-00-472065-2.
- Morison, Samuel Eliot (1960). Victory in the Pacific. History of United States Naval Operations in World War II. Volume Fourteen. Champaign, Illinois: University of Illinois Press. ISBN 0-252-07065-8.
- O'Connell, Robert L. (1991). Sacred Vessels: the Cult of the Battleship and the Rise of the U.S. Navy. Boulder, Colorado: Westview Press. ISBN 0-8133-1116-0.
- Parkes, Oscar (1990). British Battleships. United States Naval Institute Press (first published Seeley, Service & Co., 1957). ISBN 1-55750-075-4.
- Preston, Antony (Foreword) (1989). Jane's Fighting Ships of World War II. London, UK: Random House Ltd. p. 320. ISBN 1-85170-494-9.
- Russel, Scott J. (1861). The Fleet of the Future. London, UK.
- Sondhaus, Lawrence (2001). Naval Warfare, 1815–1914. London, UK: Routledge. ISBN 978-0-415-21478-0.
- Stilwell, Paul (2001). Battleships. New York, USA: MetroBooks. p. 160. ISBN 1-58663-044-X.
- Whitley, M. J. (1998). Battleships of World War Two: An International Encyclopedia. London, UK: Arms and Armour. ISBN 1-85409-386-X.
