= Fast battleship =

Battleship that emphasizes speed without undue compromises in armor or armament

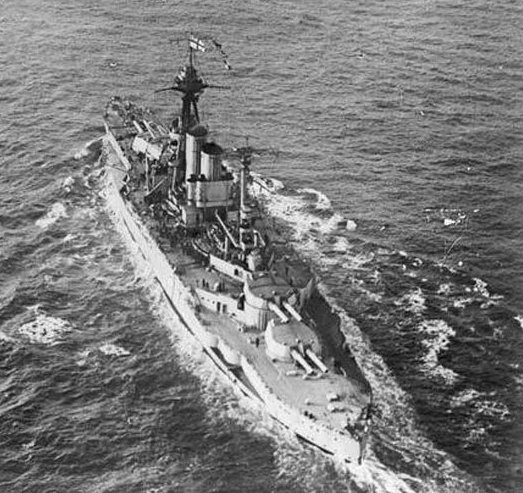
HMS Queen Elizabeth, the first "fast battleship" of the Dreadnought era, in 1918

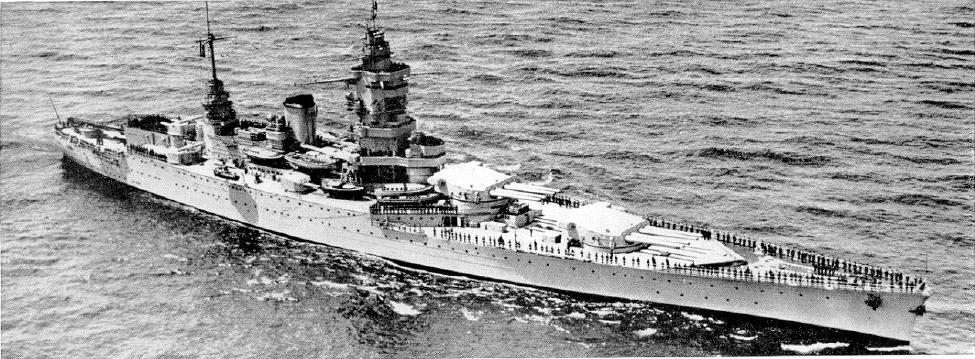
French battleship Dunkerque

A fast battleship was a battleship which in concept emphasised speed without undue compromise of either armor or armament. Most of the early World War I-era dreadnought battleships were typically built with low design speeds, so the term "fast battleship" is applied to a design which is considerably faster. The extra speed of a fast battleship was normally required to allow the vessel to carry out additional roles besides taking part in the line of battle, such as escorting aircraft carriers.

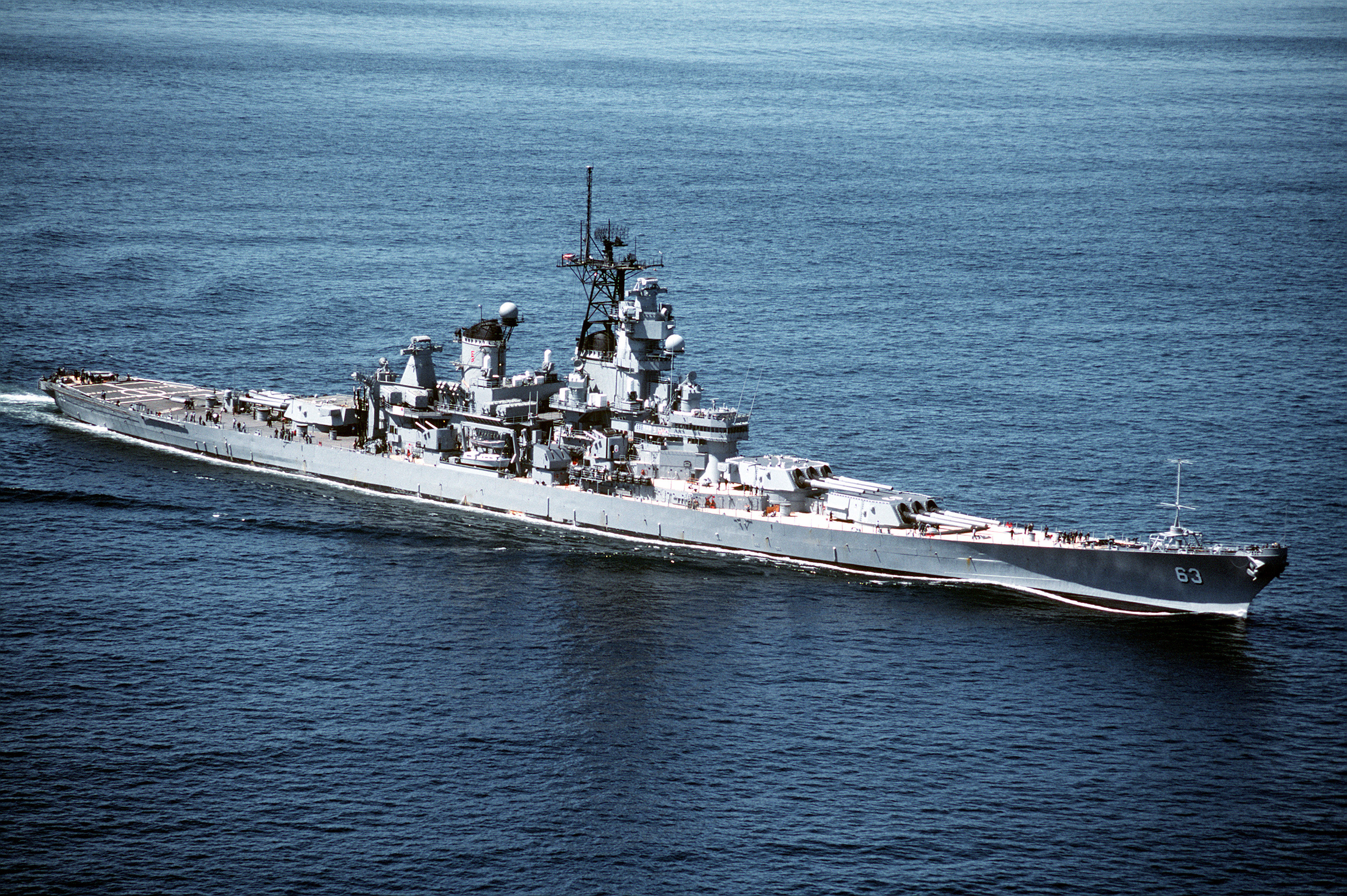
USS Missouri, among the last "fast battleships", would serve until 1992

A fast battleship was distinguished from a battlecruiser in that it would have been expected to be able to engage hostile battleships in sustained combat on at least equal terms. The requirement to deliver increased speed without compromising fighting ability or protection was the principal challenge of fast battleship design. While increasing length-to-beam ratio was the most direct method of attaining a higher speed, this meant a bigger ship that was considerably more costly and/or could exceed the naval treaty tonnage limits (where these applied, such as the Washington Naval Treaty shaping naval fleet composition after World War I). Technological advancements such as propulsion improvements and light, high-strength armor plating were required in order to make fast battleships feasible.

Unlike battlecruiser, which became official Royal Navy usage in 1911, the term fast battleship was essentially an informal one. The warships of the Queen Elizabeth class were collectively termed the Fast Division when operating with the Grand Fleet. Otherwise, fast battleships were not distinguished from conventional battleships in official documentation; nor were they recognised as a distinctive category in contemporary ship lists or treaties. There is no separate code for fast battleships in the U.S. Navy's hull classification system, all battleships, fast or slow, being rated as "BB".

== Origins ==
Between the origins of the armoured battleship with the French Gloire and the Royal Navy's Warrior at the start of the 1860s, and the genesis of the Royal Navy's Queen Elizabeth class in 1911, several battleship classes appeared which set new standards of speed. Warrior, at over 14 knots (26 km/h) under steam, was the fastest warship of her day as well as the most powerful. With the increasing weight of guns and armour, this speed was not exceeded until Monarch (1868) achieved 15 knots (28 km/h) under steam. The Italian Italia of 1880 was a radical design, with a speed of 18 knots (33 km/h), heavy guns and no belt armour; this speed was not matched until the 1890s, when higher speeds came to be associated with second-class designs such as the Renown of 1895 (18 knots) and the Swiftsure and Triumph of 1903 (20 knots). In these late pre-dreadnought designs, the high speed may have been intended to compensate for their lesser staying power, allowing them to evade a more powerful opponent when necessary.

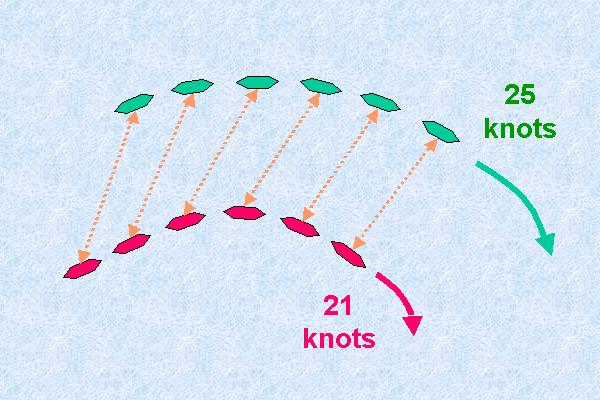
Figure 1. Concept that maneuverability and armament were more important than speed. A slower ship with larger guns could render a speedier ship's advantage moot.

From about 1900, interest in the possibility of a major increase in the speed of Royal Navy battleships was provoked by Sir John ("Jackie") Fisher, Commander-in-Chief of the Mediterranean Fleet. The Senior Officer's War Course of January 1902 was asked to investigate whether a ship with lighter armour and quick-firing medium guns (6 to 10 in, 150 to 250 mm calibre), with a 4-knot (7 km/h) advantage in speed, would obtain any tactical advantage over a conventional battleship. It was concluded that "gun power was more important than speed, provided both sides were determined to fight"; although the faster fleet would be able to choose the range at which it fought, it would be outmatched at any range. It was argued that, provided that the fighting was at long range, an attempt by the faster fleet to obtain a concentration of fire by "crossing the T" could be frustrated by a turn-away, leading to the slower fleet "turning inside the circle of the faster fleet at a radius proportional to the difference in speed" (Figure 1). War games conducted by the General Board of the U.S. Navy in 1903 and 1904 came to very similar conclusions.

Fisher appears to have been unimpressed by these demonstrations and continued to press for radical increases in the speed of battleships. His ideas ultimately came to at least partial fruition in the Dreadnought of 1906; like Warrior before her, Dreadnought was the fastest as well as the most powerful battleship in the world.

== Early dreadnoughts ==
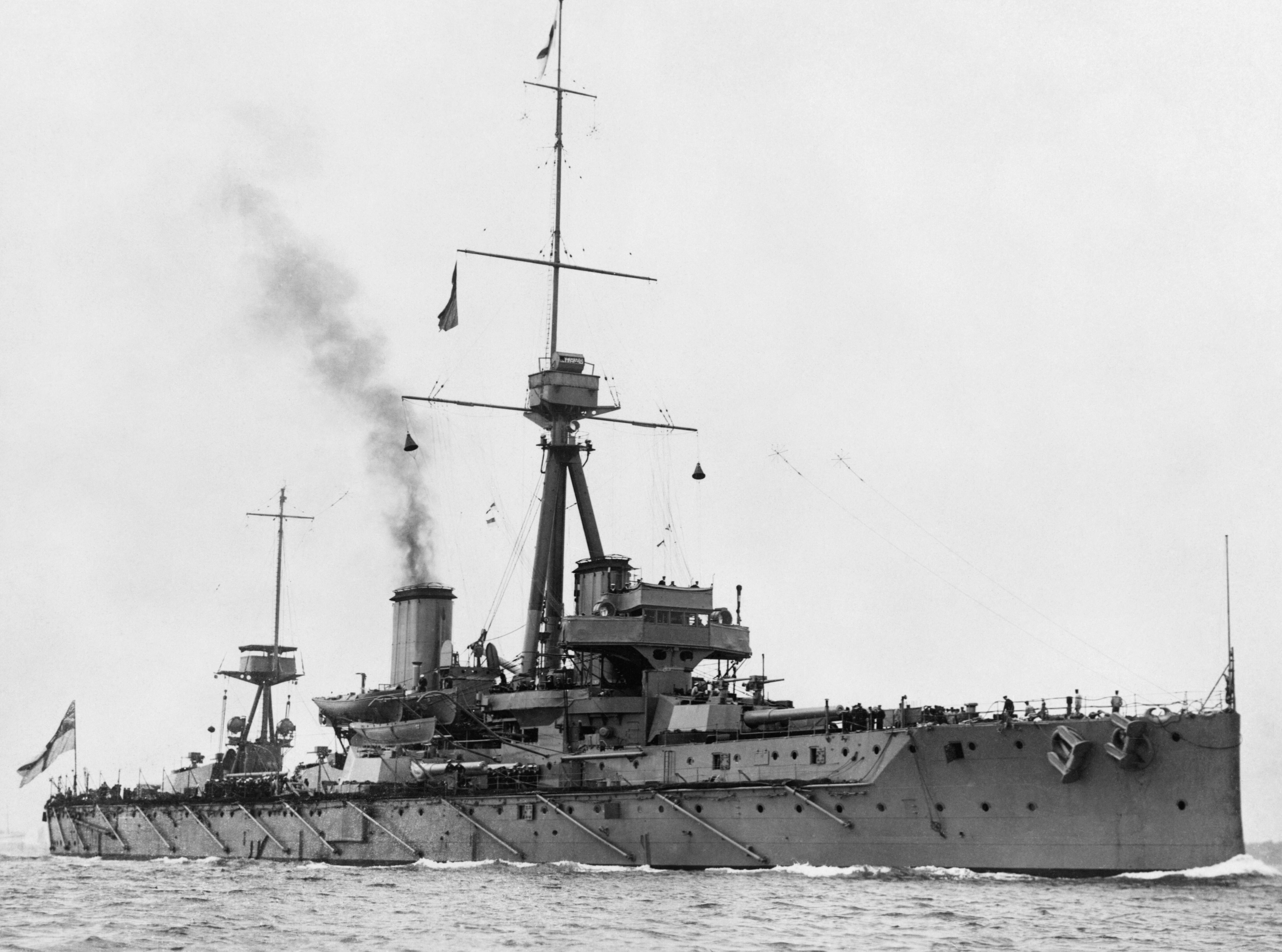
HMS Dreadnought

Dreadnought was the first major warship powered by turbines. She also included other features indicating an increased emphasis on speed:

- An improved hull form was developed, with increased length-to-beam ratio.
- The thickness of the main belt was reduced to 11 inches, compared to 12 inches for preceding classes.
- The belt terminated at the upper deck, the usual "upper belt" being deleted.
- The forecastle was raised, allowing higher sustained speed in heavy seas.

In the decade following the construction of Dreadnought, the Royal Navy's lead in capital ship speed eroded as rival navies responded with their own turbine-powered "dreadnoughts". Meanwhile, in the UK, Fisher continued to press for still higher speeds, but the alarming cost of the new battleships and battlecruisers provoked increasing resistance, both within the Admiralty and from the Liberal government that took office in 1906. As a result, many potentially significant fast battleship designs failed to achieve fruition.

A notable abortive design was the 22,500-ton "X4" design of December 1905. This would have been a true fast battleship by the standards of the time, carrying the same armament and protection as Dreadnought at a speed of 25 knots (46 km/h). However, the British lead in dreadnought and battlecruiser construction was deemed to be so great that a further escalation in the size and cost of capital ships could not be justified. The X4 design is often described as a "fusion" of the Dreadnought concept with that of the battlecruiser, and it has been suggested that she "would have rendered the Invincibles obsolete".

Fisher was again rebuffed in 1909 over the first of the "super-dreadnoughts", the Orion class; of the two alternative designs considered, one of 21 knots (39 km/h) and the other of 23 knots (43 km/h), the Board of Admiralty selected the slower and cheaper design. Fisher had his dissent recorded in the board minutes, complaining "we should not be outclassed in any type of ship".

== Queen Elizabeth class ==
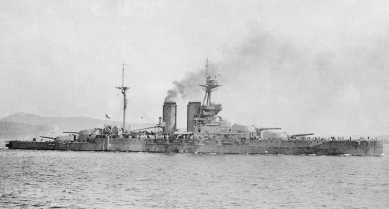
HMS Queen Elizabeth in 1915

Fisher's aspirations for faster battleships were not fulfilled until after his retirement in 1910. Following the success of the 13.5-inch (343 mm) gun used in the Orion class, the Admiralty decided to develop a 15-inch (381 mm) gun to equip the battleships of the 1912 construction programme. The initial intention was that the new battleships would have the same configuration as the preceding Iron Duke class, with five twin turrets and a speed of 21 knots (39 km/h; 24 mph). However, it was realised that by dispensing with the amidships turret, it would be possible to free up weight and volume for a much enlarged power plant and still fire a heavier broadside than the Iron Dukes.

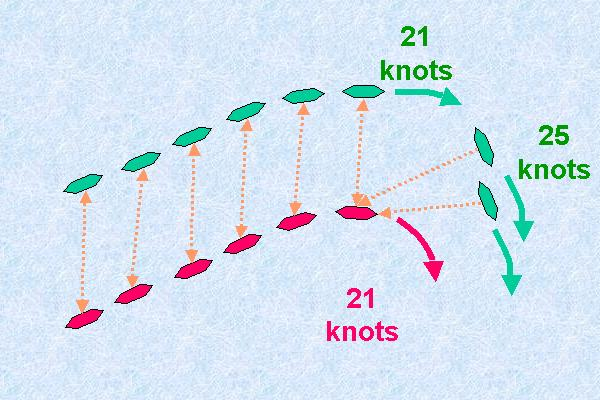
Figure 2. The concept that faster ships in a battle line could envelop an enemy's slower fleet.

Although War College studies had earlier rejected the concept of a fast, light battlefleet, they were now supportive of the concept of a Fast Division of 25 knots (46 km/h; 29 mph) or more, operating in conjunction with a conventional heavy battle line, which could use its advantage in speed to envelop the head of the enemy line (Figure 2). Compared to Fisher's idea of speeding up the entire battlefleet, the advantages of this concept were that there would be no need to compromise the fighting power of the main fleet, and that it would be possible to retain the use of the existing 21-knot ships. Up to this time, it had been assumed that the role of a Fast Division could be fulfilled by the battlecruisers, of which there were ten completed or on order. However, it was realised that there were two problems with this assumption. The first was the likelihood that the battlecruisers would be fully committed in countering the growing and very capable German battlecruiser force. The second was that, as Winston Churchill, First Lord of the Admiralty, put it, "our beautiful Cats had thin skins compared to the enemy's strongest battleships. It is a rough game to pit ... seven or nine inches of armour against twelve or thirteen".

The new battleships would, in fact, be the most heavily armoured dreadnoughts in the fleet. The original 1912 programme envisaged three battleships and a battlecruiser. However, given the speed of the new ships, it was decided that a new battlecruiser would not be needed. The battleship design for the following year's programme, which became the Revenge class, also had 15-inch guns, but reverted to the 21-knot speed of the main battlefleet. Again, no battlecruiser was included, a decision which suggests that the fast battleships were perceived at that time as superseding the battlecruiser concept.

== Battle of Jutland ==
When the fast battleship concept was put to the test at the Battle of Jutland, the Queen Elizabeth class ships had been temporarily attached to Vice Admiral David Beatty's Battlecruiser Fleet at Rosyth (this was to release the Invincible-class battlecruisers of the 3rd Battlecruiser Squadron for gunnery practice at Scapa Flow). The Queen Elizabeth ships proved an outstanding success, firing with great rapidity, accuracy and effect, while surviving large quantities of hits from German 28.3-centimetre (11 in) and 30.5-centimetre (12 in) shells and successfully evading the main German battlefleet during the so-called "run to the North". In the fighting, Warspite was severely damaged, suffered a steering failure and was obliged to withdraw, while Malaya suffered a serious cordite fire which nearly caused her loss. However, both ships returned safely to port. This was in notable contrast to the performance of the battlecruisers, of which three out of the nine present were destroyed by magazine explosions after a relatively small number of hits.

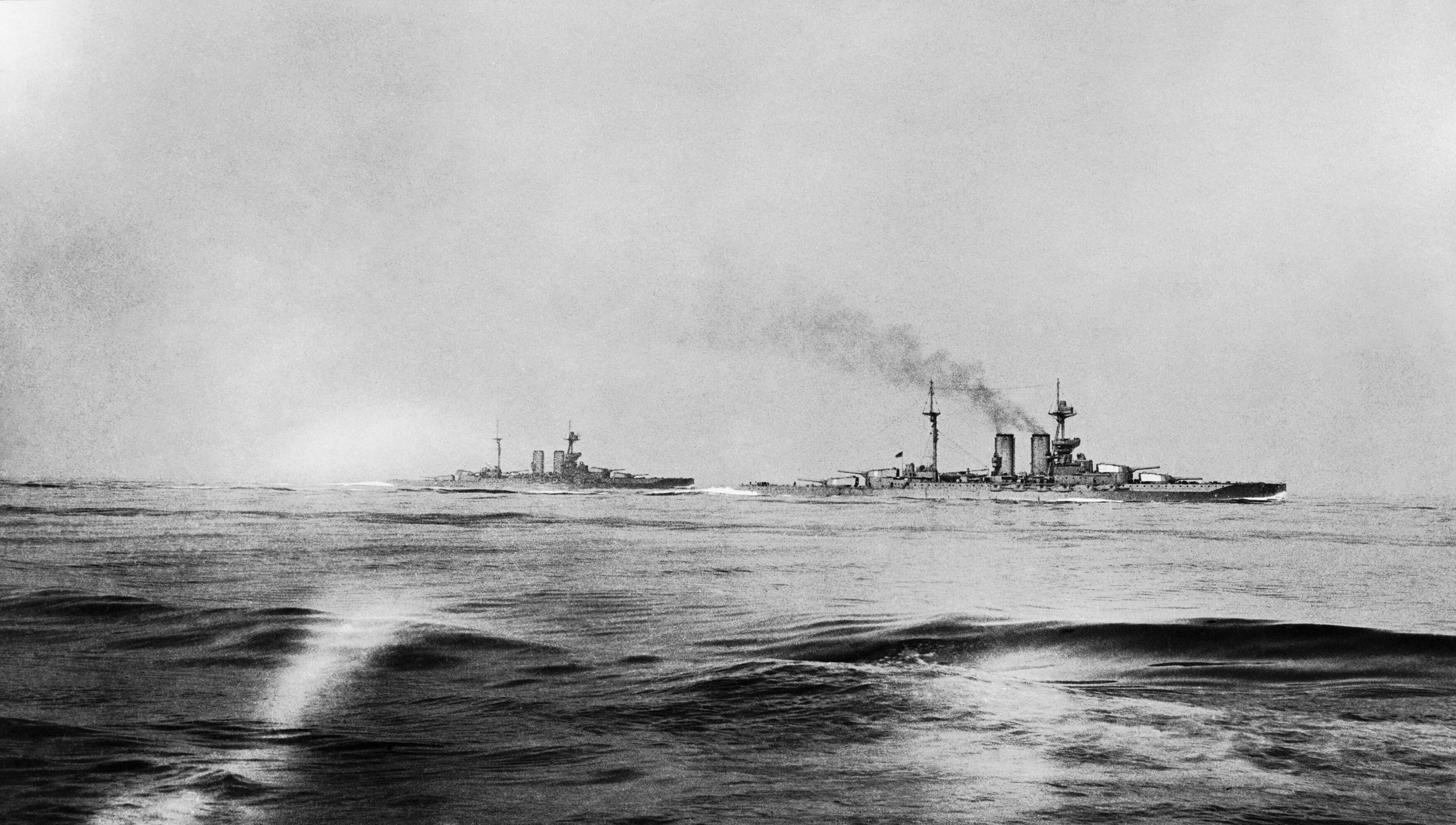
HMS Warspite and Malaya, seen from HMS Valiant at around 14:00 hrs during the Battle of Jutland

When the main body of the Grand Fleet came into action, the Queen Elizabeth ships were unable to reach their intended station ahead of the battle line and instead joined the rear of the line, seeing little further action. Meanwhile, the six surviving battlecruisers assumed the "Fast Division" role, operating ahead of the battle line with some success, exploiting their advantage of speed to damage the head of the German line with virtual impunity.

Jutland was a crippling blow to the reputation of the existing battlecruisers. However, it also reinforced the views of Commander-In-Chief Sir John Jellicoe that the Queen Elizabeth ships were too slow to operate with the Battlecruiser Fleet on a permanent basis. Based on combat reports, Jellicoe erroneously credited the 21-knot German König-class battleships with 23 knots (43 km/h; 26 mph), which would mean that Queen Elizabeth ships, which were rated at 24 knots (44 km/h; 28 mph), would be in serious danger if they were surprised by a battlefleet headed by these ships.

== Admiral class ==
Even before Jutland, Jellicoe had expressed concern at the lack of new construction for the Battlecruiser Fleet and the inadequacy of the ships already provided. Early in 1916, he had rejected proposals for a new fast battleship design, similar to the Queen Elizabeth but with reduced draught, pointing out that, with the five new Revenge-class nearing completion, the fleet already had a sufficient margin of superiority in battleships, whereas the absence of battlecruisers from the 1912 and 1913 programmes had left Beatty's force with no reply to the new 12-inch-gunned German battlecruisers. Jellicoe believed that the Germans intended to build still more powerful ships, with speeds of up to 29 knots (54 km/h; 33 mph), and hence called for 30-knot (56 km/h; 35 mph) ships to fight them. Although two new battlecruisers (Renown and Repulse) had been ordered in 1914, and were being constructed remarkably quickly, Jellicoe argued that, although their speed was adequate, their armour protection was insufficient. The 1915 design was therefore recast as a 36,000-long-ton (37,000 t) battlecruiser with eight 15-inch (381 mm) guns, an eight-inch belt, and a speed of 32 knots (59 km/h; 37 mph). A class of four ships was ordered in mid-1916.

The losses at Jutland led to a reappraisal of the design. As noted above, the British were now convinced that their fast battleships were battleworthy but too slow, and their battlecruisers—even the largest—unfit for sustained battle. As a result, the ships were radically redesigned in order to achieve the survivability of the Queen Elizabeths while still meeting the requirement for 32-knot (59 km/h; 37 mph) battlecruisers, although this reworking was flawed. The resulting ships would be the Admiral-class battlecruisers; at 42,000 long tons (43,000 t) tons by far the largest warships in the world. In 1917 construction was slowed down to release resources for the construction of anti-submarine vessels; when it became clear that the threatened German battlecruisers would not be completed, the last three were suspended and ultimately canceled, leaving only the lead ship, Hood, to be completed.

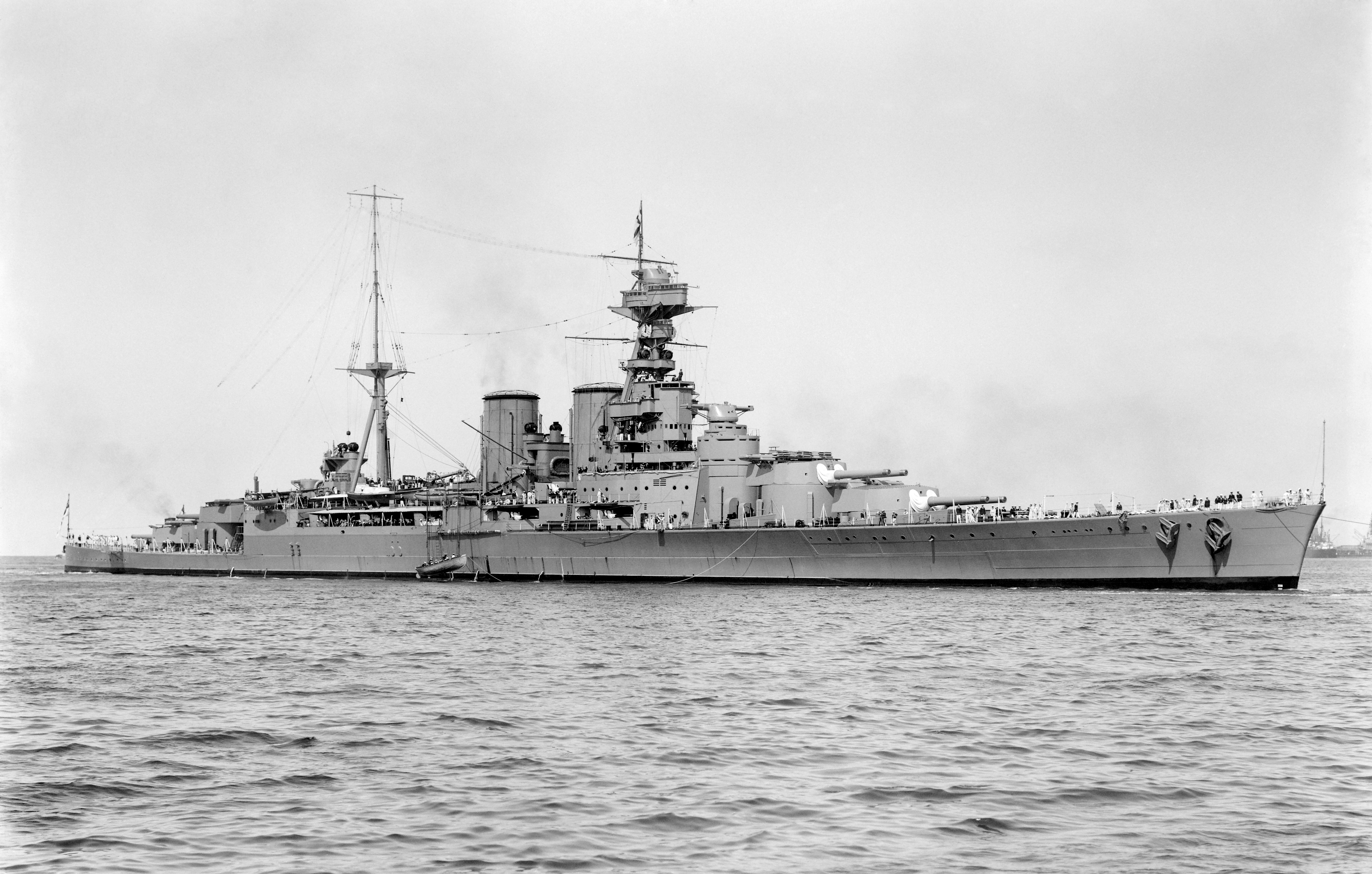
The only member of the Admiral class, HMS Hood

Although the Royal Navy designated Hood as a battlecruiser, some naval historians such as Antony Preston characterise her as a fast battleship, as she theoretically had the protection of the Queen Elizabeth ships while being significantly faster. On the other hand, the British were well aware of the protection flaws remaining despite her revised design, so she was intended for the duties of a battlecruiser and served in the battlecruiser squadrons throughout her career, other than a few months assigned to Force H in 1940. Moreover, the scale of her protection, though adequate for the Jutland era, was at best marginal against the new generation of 16-inch (406 mm)-gunned capital ships that emerged soon after her completion in 1920, typified by the US Colorado class and the Japanese Nagato class.

== Other designs, 1912–1923 ==
During the First World War, the Royal Navy was unique in operating both a Fast Division of purpose-built battleships and a separate force of battlecruisers. However, from 1912 to 1923 there was a series of advances in marine engineering which would lead to a dramatic increase in the speeds specified for new battleship designs, a process terminated only by the advent of the Washington Naval Treaty. These advances included:

- small-tube boilers, allowing more efficient transfer of heat from boiler to propulsive steam;
- increases in steam pressure and temperature;
- reduction gearing, which allowed propellers to rotate at a slower, and more efficient, speed than the turbines that powered them;

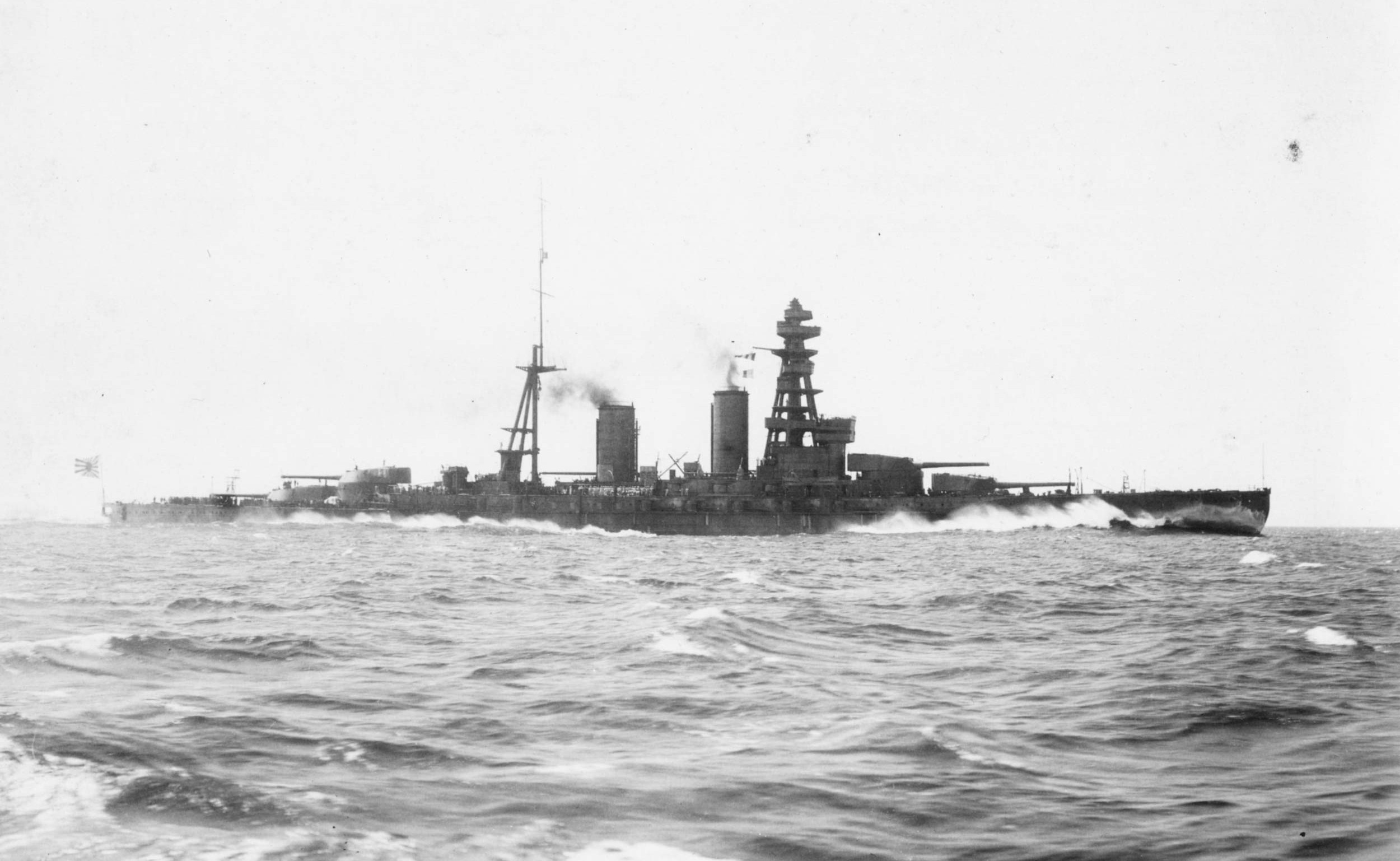
Nagato-class battleship Mutsu at sea, 19 October 1921

By the early 1920s, the wealth of the U.S. and the ambition of Japan (the two Great Powers least ravaged by World War I) were forcing the pace of capital ship design. The Nagato class set a new standard for fast battleships, with 16-inch (406 mm) guns and a speed of 26.5 knots (49.1 km/h). The Japanese appear to have shared Fisher's aspiration for a progressive increase in the speed of the whole battlefleet, influenced partly by their success at outmanoeuvring the Russian fleet at Tsushima, and partly by the need to retain the tactical initiative against potentially larger hostile fleets. The immediate influence of the Nagatos was limited by the fact that the Japanese kept their actual speed a closely guarded secret, admitting to only 23 knots (43 km/h; 26 mph). As a result, the U.S. Navy, which had hitherto adhered steadily to a 21-knot (39 km/h) battlefleet, settled for a modest increase to the same speed in the abortive South Dakota class of 1920.

The Japanese planned to follow up the Nagatos with the Kii class, (ten 16-inch (406 mm) guns, 29.75 knots, 39,900 tons) described as "fast capital ships" and, according to Conway's, representing a fusion of the battlecruiser and battleship types. Meanwhile, the Royal Navy, alarmed at the rapid erosion of its preeminence in capital ships, was developing even more radical designs; the 18-inch (457 mm) gunned N3 class and the 32-knot (59 km/h; 37 mph), 16-inch (406 mm) gunned G3 class both of some 48,000 tons. Officially described as battlecruisers, the G3s were far better protected than any previous British capital ship and have generally been regarded, like the Kiis, as true fast battleships. The G3s were given priority over the N3s, showing that they were considered fit for the line of battle, and orders were actually placed. However, both the British and the Japanese governments baulked at the monstrous cost of their respective programmes and ultimately were forced to accede to U.S. proposals for an arms limitation conference; this convened at Washington, D.C., in 1921 and resulted in the 1922 Washington Naval Treaty. This treaty precipitated the demise of the giant fast battleship designs, although the British used a scaled-down version of the G3 design to build two new battleships permitted under the treaty; the resulting Nelson-class vessels were completed with the modest speed of 23 knots.

The Italian Francesco Caracciolo-class battleships were designed to be similar to the Queen Elizabeth class, with eight 15-inch guns and a top speed of 28 knots (52 km/h; 32 mph), and therefore can be considered fast battleships. However, construction (begun in 1914–1915) was stopped by the war, and none was ever completed.

== Washington Naval Treaty era ==
The signatories of the Washington Naval Treaty were the U.S., UK, Japan, France, and Italy; at that time the only nations in the world with significant battlefleets. As a result, the terms of the treaty, and the subsequent treaties of London 1930 and London 1936, had a decisive effect on the future of capital ship design. The treaties extended the definition of capital ship to cover all warships exceeding 10,000 tons standard displacement or carrying guns exceeding 8-inch (203 mm) calibre; imposed limits on the total tonnage of capital ships allowed to each signatory; and fixed an upper limit of 35,000 long tons (36,000 t) standard displacement for all future construction. These restrictions effectively signaled the end of the battlecruiser as a distinct category of warship, since any future big-gun cruiser would count against the capital ship tonnage allowance. It also greatly complicated the problem of fast battleship design, since the 35,000-ton limit closed off the most direct route to higher speed, as the increasing length-to-beam ratio would have meant a bigger ship; it required the development of more compact and powerful propulsion plants and lighter high-strength armour plating over the next two decades to make fast battleships feasible within the displacement limit.

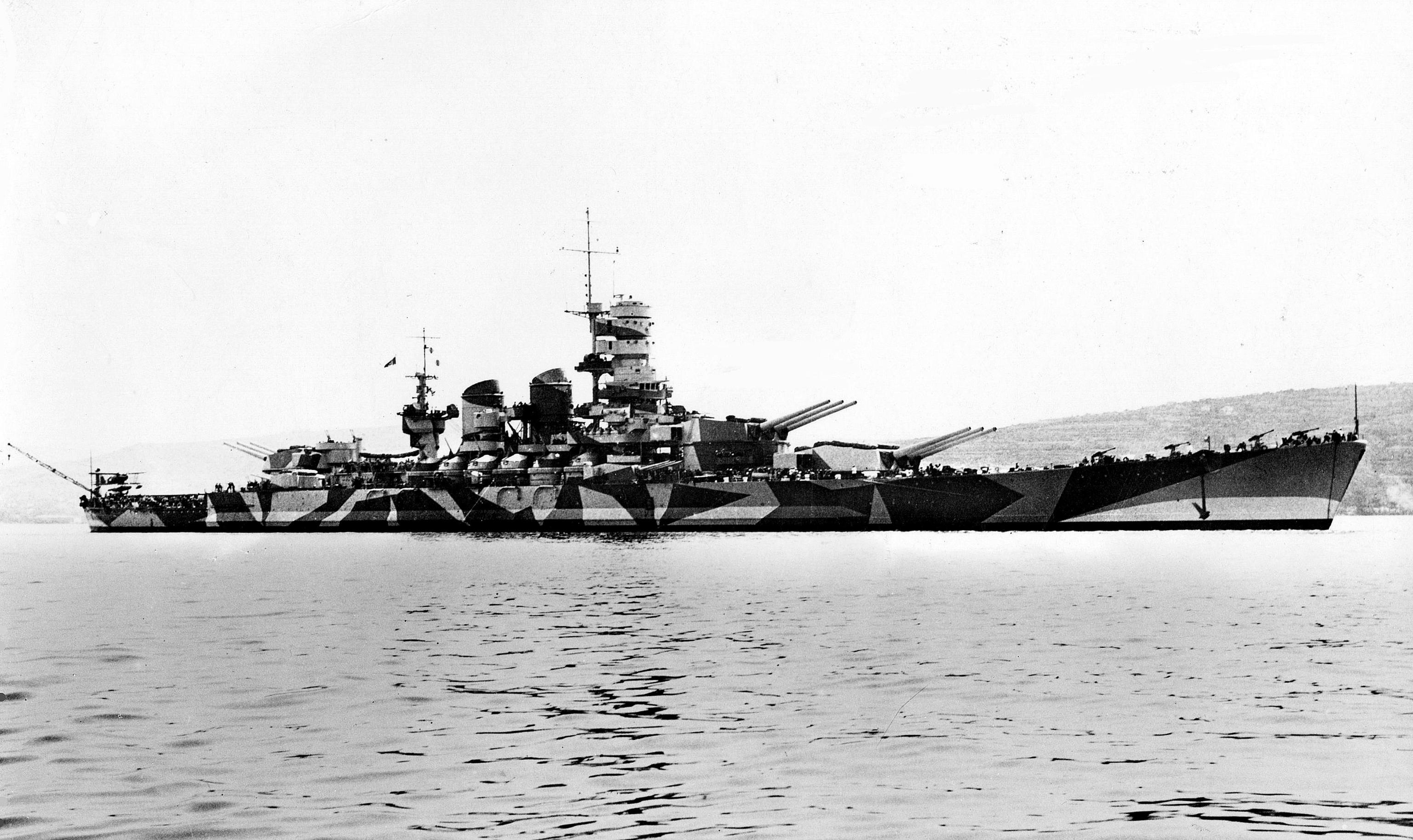
Littorio-class battleship Roma c. 1942–1943

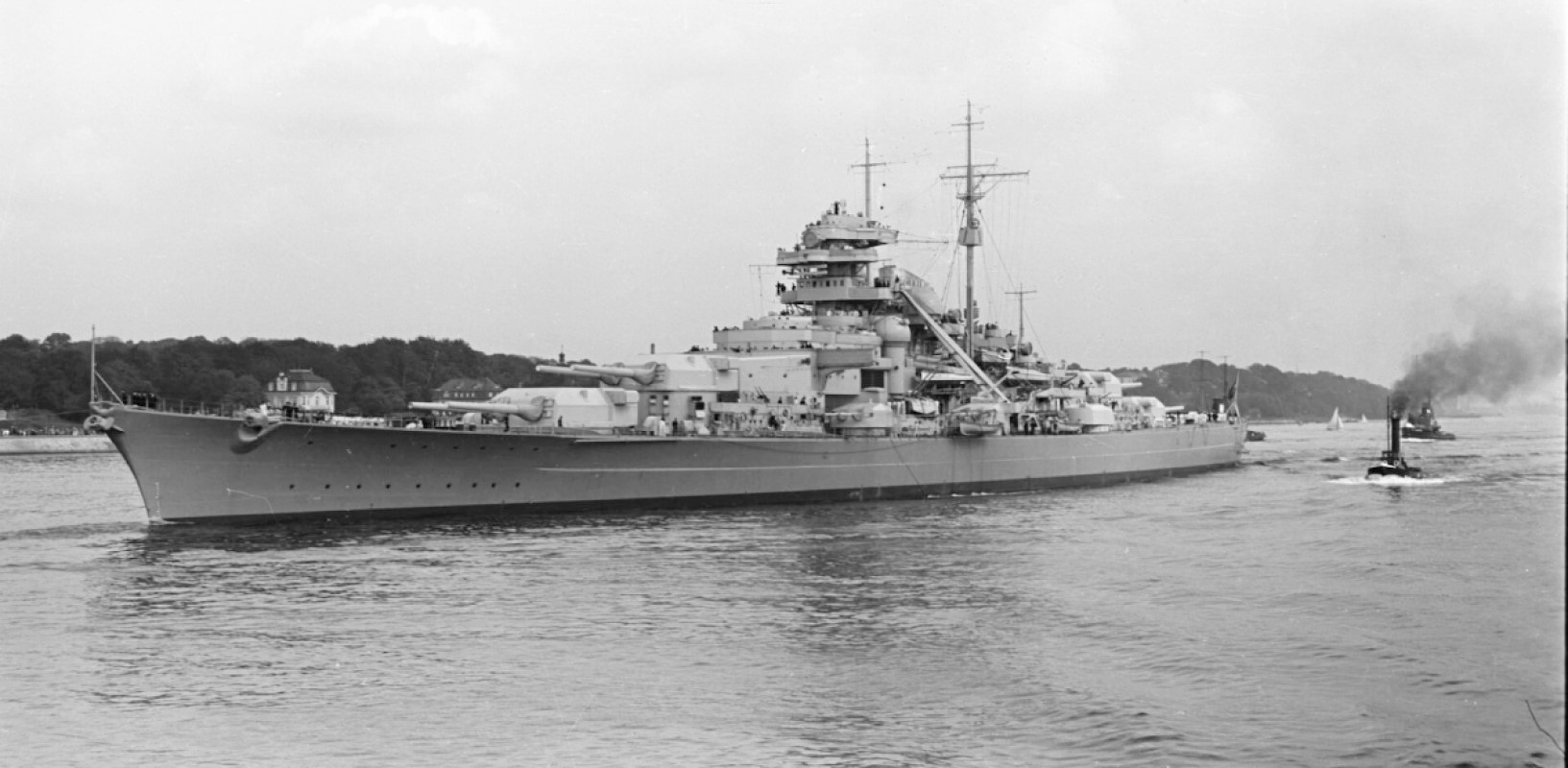
Bismarck underway near Blankenese in 1940

Evidence of continued interest in high-speed capital ships is given by the fact that, although the signatories of the treaties were allowed to build 16-inch (406 mm) gunned ships as their existing tonnage became due for replacement, most of them passed up the opportunity to do so, preferring instead lighter-armed but faster ships. A British Admiralty paper of 1935 concludes that a balanced design with 30-knot (56 km/h; 35 mph) speed and 16-inch guns would not be possible within the 35,000 ton limit, since it would be either insufficiently armoured or too slow; it is clear that by this date the 23-knot (43 km/h; 26 mph) speed of the Nelsons was considered insufficient. The recommended design (never built) was one with nine 15-inch (381 mm) guns and speed "not less than 29 knots (54 km/h; 33 mph)"; the King George V class that was actually built was similar to the recommended design but mounted ten 14-inch (356 mm) guns (down from twelve guns of the initial design due to top weight concerns) in an effort to convince other naval powers to abide by the 14-inch calibre limit of the Second London Treaty. Although the calibre "escalator clause" increasing the limit back to 16 inches was invoked in April 1937 due to Italy's and Japan's refusal to sign the treaty, the British chose to proceed with the 14-inch guns on the King George V since they needed these battleships badly, as redesigning the ships for 15-inch guns would be an eighteen month delay, and instead incorporated larger guns in follow-on designs.

The 15-inch-gunned Littorio and Richelieu classes, built in the 1930s by Italy and France respectively, reflect similar priorities to the British. Under the terms of the Anglo-German Naval Agreement of 1935 that effectively made Germany a party to the Second London Treaty, the German Bismarck class was built as a response to the Richelieu class and also mounted 15-inch guns, although the ships were secretly considerably larger than the limits of the treaties. In 1937, the Soviet Union signed the Anglo-Soviet Quantitative Naval Agreement and also agreed to abide by the terms of the Second London Treaty when beginning to design their Project 23 or Sovetsky Soyuz class (never completed due to the eventual German invasion), although they added a proviso that allowed them to build ships of unlimited size to face the Japanese navy if they notified the British.

Four capital ships of the treaty era were built to displacements appreciably less than the 35,000-ton limit; the French Dunkerque and Strasbourg and the German Scharnhorst and Gneisenau. The Dunkerque class was built in response to the German Panzerschiff (or "pocket battleship") Deutschland class. The Panzerschiffe were, in effect, a revival of the late 19th century concept of the commerce-raiding armoured cruiser; long-ranged, heavily armed, and fast enough to evade a conventional capital ship. Likewise, the Dunkerque, can be regarded as a revival of the armoured cruiser's nemesis, the battlecruiser. With 29-knot speed and 330 mm (13 inch) guns, she could operate independently of the fleet, relying on her speed to avoid confrontation with a more powerful adversary, and could easily overtake and overwhelm a Panzerschiff, just as Sturdee's battlecruisers had done to von Spee's cruisers at the Falkland Islands in 1914. On the other hand, as a member of the line of battle, alongside the elderly and slow dreadnoughts that made up the rest of the French battlefleet, the design would make no sense, since her speed would lose its value and neither her armament nor her protection would be at all effective against a modern 16-inch gunned battleship such as Nelson.

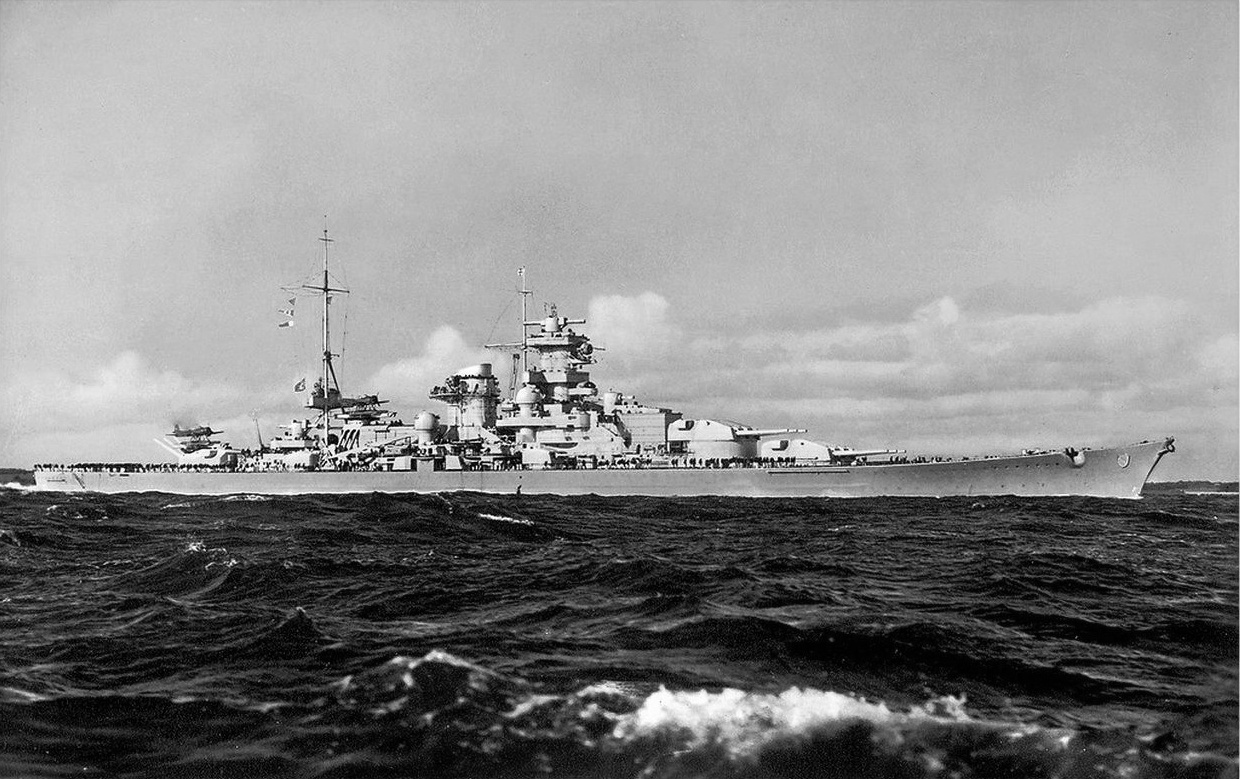
Scharnhorst at sea

The Scharnhorst and Gneisenau were Germany's response to the Dunkerques. They were an attempt to redress the inadequacies of the Panzerschiff design in speed, survivability and powerplant (the diesel engines of the Panzerschiffe were unreliable and produced severe vibration at high speed), and used much material assembled for the Panzerschiffe programme (most significantly, the six triple 11-inch (279 mm) gun mountings originally intended for Panzerschiffe D to F). Although much larger than the Dunkerques, the Scharnhorsts were also not intended for the line of battle; apart from their insufficient armament, set-piece battles against the vastly more numerous Allied battlefleets had no place in Germany's strategic requirements. Instead, the two German ships relied throughout their career on their superlative speed (over 32 knots) to evade the attentions of Allied capital ships. On Gneisenau, the nine 28.3 cm SK C/34 guns in three triple turrets were supposed to be replaced with six 38.1 cm SK C/34 guns in twin turrets, which would have rectified her key weakness (although six main naval guns was fewer than WWI-era or Treaty battleships with eight or nine main guns), but work was cancelled in 1943 due to changing wartime conditions. The Scharnhorst-class have been occasionally referred in English language reference works as battlecruisers due to their weak armament while having high speed and being well-protected, similar to how Kaiserliche Marine battlecruisers were designed.

The treaties also allowed the reconstruction of surviving battleships from the First World War, including up to 3,000 long tons (3,000 t) additional protection against torpedoes, high-altitude bombing and long-range gunnery. In the late 1930s, the Italian and Japanese navies opted for extremely radical reconstructions: in addition to replacing the powerplant in their existing ships, they lengthened the ships by adding extra sections amidships or aft. This had a double benefit; the extra space allowed the size of the powerplant to be increased, while the extra length improved the speed/length ratio and so reduced the resistance of the hull. As a result, both navies realised significant increases in speed; for example the Japanese Ise class was increased from 23 to 25 knots (46 km/h; 29 mph), and the Italian Conte di Cavour class from 21 to 27 knots (39 to 50 km/h; 24 to 31 mph). France, the UK and the US took a less radical approach, rebuilding their ships within their original hulls; boilers were converted to oil-firing or replaced, as were the engines in some cases, but increases in the output of the powerplant were generally canceled out by increases in the weight of armour, anti-aircraft armament and other equipment.

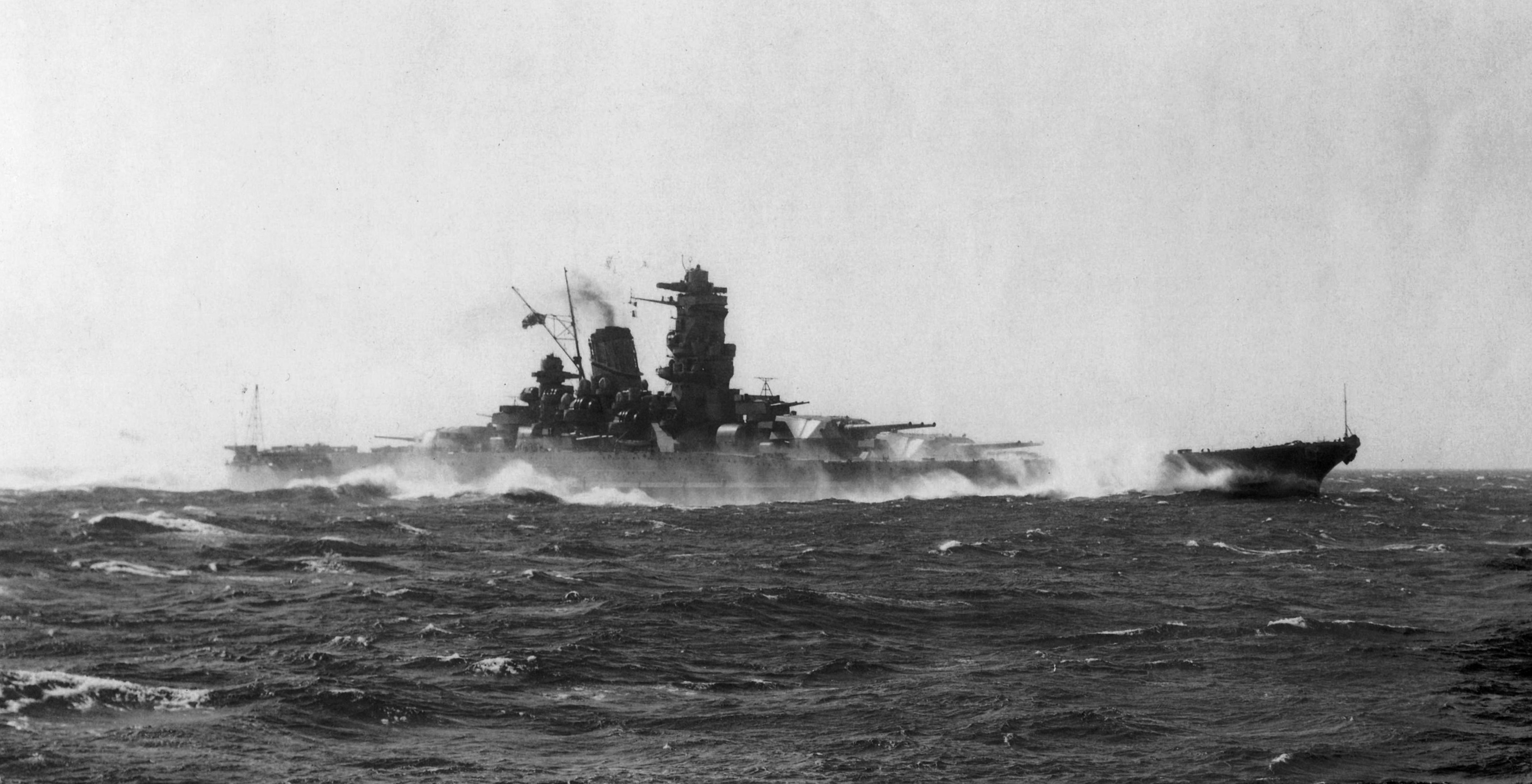
Yamato undertaking sea trials in the Bungo Channel, 20 October 1941

The exception to the European battleship trend was Japan, which refused to sign the Second London Treaty. It rather uncharacteristically settled for a moderate speed of 27 knots, for the sake of exceptionally high levels of protection and firepower in the 18.1-inch (460 mm)-gunned, 64,000-long-ton (65,000 t) displacement Yamato class. Furthermore, although the Soviet Union was nominally held to the 35,000-ton Second London Treaty limit by signing the Anglo-Soviet Quantitative Naval Agreement of 1937, it only paid lip service to the agreement and the Sovetsky Soyuz design, with nine 16-inch guns and 28-knot speed, quickly grew to over 58,000 long tons (59,000 t) when laid down in 1938. The eventual German invasion would prevent their completion.

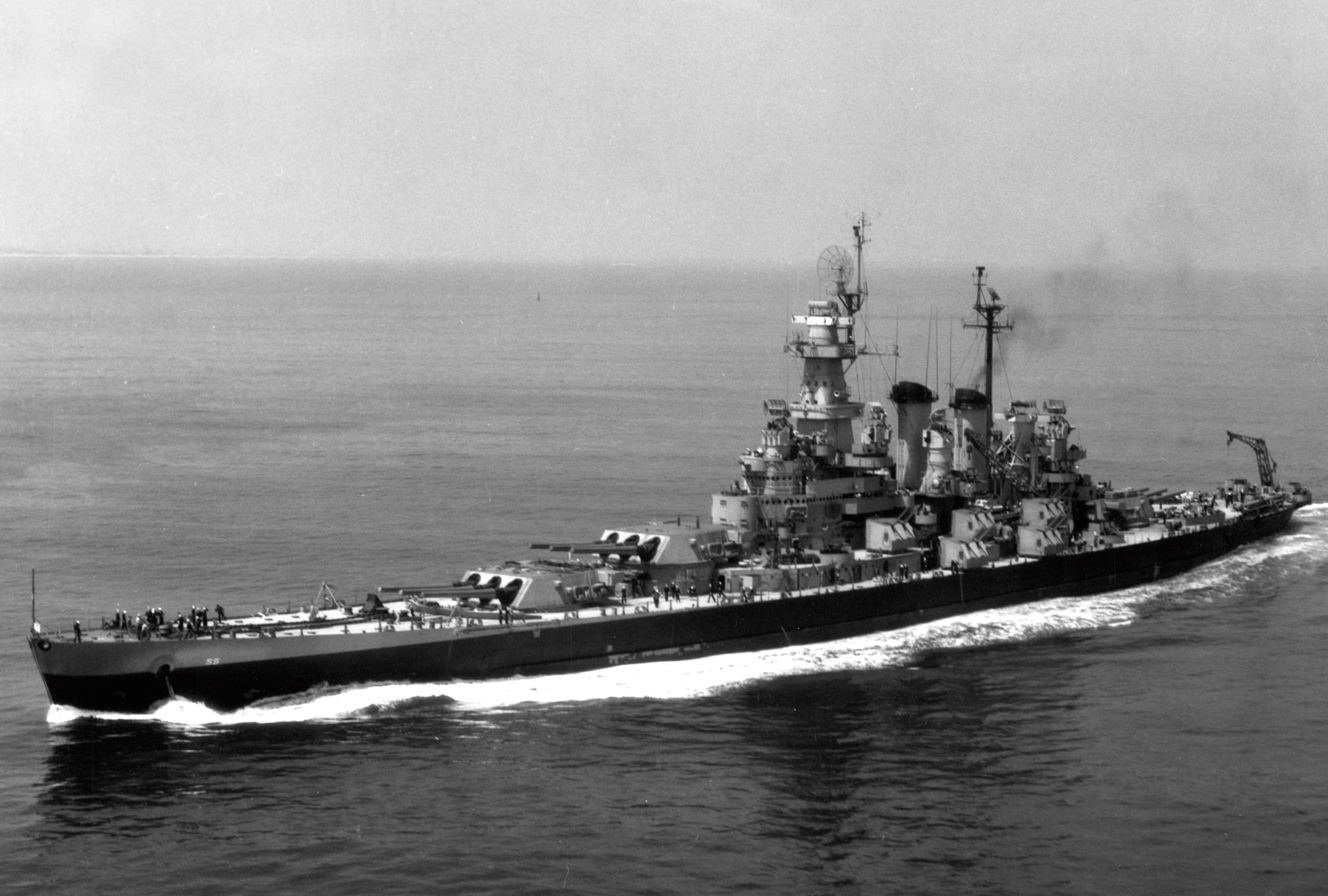
North Carolina off New York, 3 June 1946

After much debate, the US settled on two 35,000 ton classes, also with a speed of 27 knots, in the North Carolina and South Dakota classes. Due to treaty restrictions, firepower and protection were emphasised first, although both did manage respectable speed increases compared to their World War I contemporaries to be able to operate as carrier escorts. The US signed the Second London Treaty but was quick to invoke the "escalator clause" to increase the main battleship caliber from 14 to 16 inches as Italy and Japan refused to adopt it. This made the North Carolinas somewhat unbalanced ships, with armor being designed to resist shells from the 14-inch guns that it was originally intended to carry, but being up-gunned during construction. The South Dakotas rectified this with protection proof against 16-inch guns, albeit the original lightweight 2,240-pound (1,020 kg) shells but not the super-heavy 2,700-pound (1,200 kg) shells they were ending up equipped with. In order to counter the increase in armor weight and stay within tonnage limits, the South Dakota class had to go with a shorter hull to reduce the length of the required protected area, compensating by installing more powerful machinery than in the North Carolinas, and this made the ships somewhat cramped in terms of accommodation. The balanced 35,000-ton design was achieved by combining highly efficient lightweight double-reduction gear machinery with high pressure turbines, which reduced the length and volume of the armored citadel, while a sloped internal armored belt increased protection without increasing overall armor thickness although this had the disadvantage of being more difficult to repair (the hull had to be cut out first to replace the damaged armor).

With Japan's withdrawal from the Second London Treaty and refusal to disclose any details about their battleship construction, the remaining signatories of UK, US, and France invoked the treaty's tonnage "escalator clause" in March 1938 that increased standard displacement limit from 35,000 tons to 45,000 long tons (46,000 t). Under the new limit, the UK and the US ordered the 16-inch-gunned Lion class and Iowa class respectively in 1939, while the French began designing the Alsace class. Despite the new limit, the UK chose to design the 30-knot (56 km/h; 35 mph) Lion-class to 40,000 long tons (41,000 t) due to limits of docking infrastructure (particularly the major naval installations at Rosyth and Portsmouth) and costs; the French would limit the 31-knot (57 km/h; 36 mph) Alsace-class to that tonnage for similar logistical reasons. The 33-knot (61 km/h; 38 mph), 45,000-ton Iowa-class was intended serve as the fast division of the battle line or be detached to intercept fast capital ships such as the Kongō class. With the additional tonnage, the Iowas had new 16-inch guns with a greater maximum range, and they had even more powerful engines and a lengthened hull for a significantly faster speed over the North Carolinas and South Dakotas.

For half a century prior to laying [the Iowa class] down, the U.S. Navy had consistently advocated armor and firepower at the expense of speed. Even in adopting fast battleships of the North Carolina class, it had preferred the slower of two alternative designs. Great and expensive improvements in machinery design had been used to minimise the increased power on the designs rather than make extraordinary powerful machinery (hence much higher speed) practical. Yet the four largest battleships the U.S. Navy produced were not much more than 33-knot versions of the 27-knot, 35,000 tonners that had preceded them. The Iowas showed no advance at all in protection over the South Dakotas. The principal armament improvement was a more powerful 16-inch gun, 5 calibers longer. Ten thousand tons was a very great deal to pay for 6 knots.

— Norman Friedman

== World War II designs ==
In 1938 the U.S., UK, and France agreed to invoke the escalator clause of the Second London Treaty, allowing them to build up to 45,000 tons standard. By this time, all three Allied nations were already committed to new 35,000-ton designs: the U.S. North Carolina (two ships) and South Dakota (four), the British King George V class (five ships) and the French Richelieus (two completed out of four planned, the last of the class, Gascogne, to a greatly modified design).

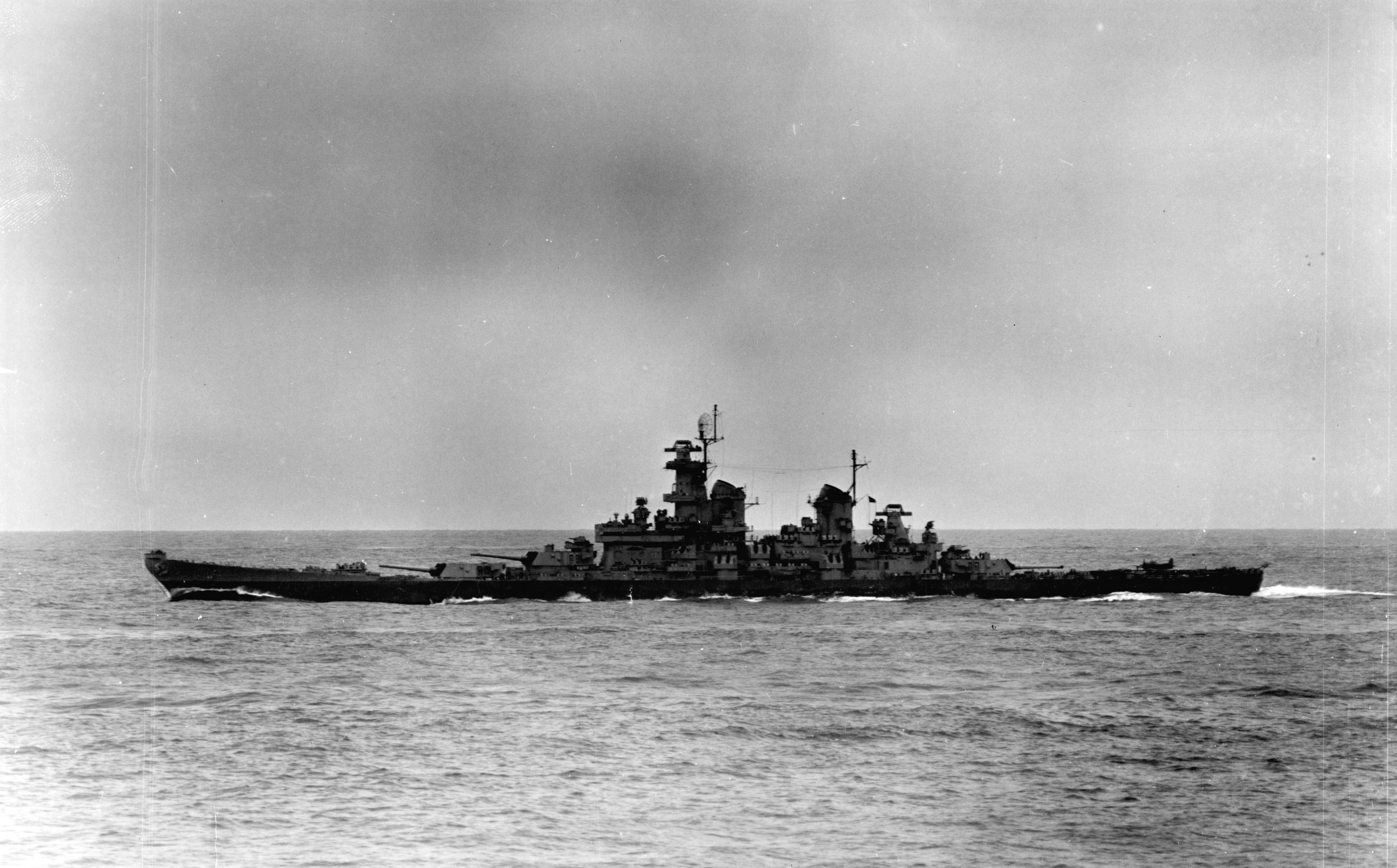
The American battleship Missouri in 1945 – she is one of the four Iowa-class battleships completed

The UK and U.S. laid down follow-on classes, designed under the 45,000 ton standard limit, in 1939 and 1940 respectively; the German victory in the Battle of France in May–June 1940 terminated France's plans for the Alsace-class. The U.S. succeeded in completing four of the intended six Iowa class (the last two members with hull numbers BB-65 and BB-66 were originally intended as the first and second ships of the Montana-class of battleships; however, the passage of an emergency war building program on 19 July 1940 resulted in both hulls being reordered as Iowa-class units to save time on construction). With a raised tonnage allowance but still required to pass through the Panama Canal's existing locks, the Iowas mounted improved 16-inch guns with a greater maximum range, and they had even more powerful engines and a lengthened hull for a significantly faster speed over the North Carolinas and South Dakotas. Although firing the same shells and having a protection scheme largely identical to the preceding South Dakotas, the more spacious accommodations and higher speed (of which the ten thousand tons increase was mostly due to) of the Iowas would enable them to be retained for post-WWII service. The British Lion class was never completed; two of the planned four units were laid down in the summer of 1939, but neither was completed because of limited capacity to produce the turrets and guns. The Lion battleships would have embarked nine 16-inch (406 mm) guns and, at 29 to 30 knots (54 to 56 km/h), would have been slightly faster than the King George V class. The UK did complete one final battleship to an "emergency" design, the Vanguard, a modified Lion design that could use the 15-inch (381 mm) gun mountings removed from the World War I "large light cruisers" Courageous and Glorious after their conversion to aircraft carriers. Her design revised during the war to adopt lessons from the loss of other ships, she was completed in 1946 and was similar in speed to the Lions.

The Montana-class battleships were the first US design since 1922 to be entirely free of treaty constraints, and also too wide to fit though the existing Panama Canal locks, though construction of the enlarged canal locks was meant to be completed around the same time that these ships would enter service. They represented "the culmination of American tradition in battleship design of emphasizing firepower and protection at the expense of speed", with massively-enhanced protection with an external armored belt, twelve 16-inch (406 mm) guns in four triple turrets (33% more firepower than preceding U.S. designs), while still managing a speed (28 knots) sufficient for carrier escort duties. At 60,500 tons standard, they approached the size of the Yamatos. Five of the Montana class were ordered in 1940, but shortages of armor-grade steel and changes in wartime building priorities resulted in their cancellation in 1943, and none were laid down.

Despite the critical role that battleships played in several World War II engagements, such as the battles of North Cape, Guadalcanal, and Surigao Strait, aircraft carriers would emerge as the most capable naval striking capability during the war and aviation usurped the battleship as the predominant means of sinking capital ships, including modern designs such as HMS Prince of Wales and Yamato. Further demonstrating this was the US Navy's Fast Carrier Task Force, the main striking force of the United States Navy in the Pacific War from January 1944 through the end of the war in September 1945. The newly built Iowa-class battleships that was intended to be the centerpiece of a fast naval striking force would end up becoming subservient to the aircraft carriers.

== Post-war designs and service ==
After the war, with aircraft carriers being the preeminent capital ships as well as the advent of nuclear weapons, most naval powers placed their battleships in their reserve fleets or scrapped them outright. However, several naval powers continued performing battleship design work for several years post-war. The UK continually updated its Lion design in light of wartime experience before finally ending these efforts in 1949. Due to Stalin's enduring interest in "big gun" ships, the Soviet Union continued with design work on the successor to the Sovetsky Soyuz, Project 24, until his death in 1953.

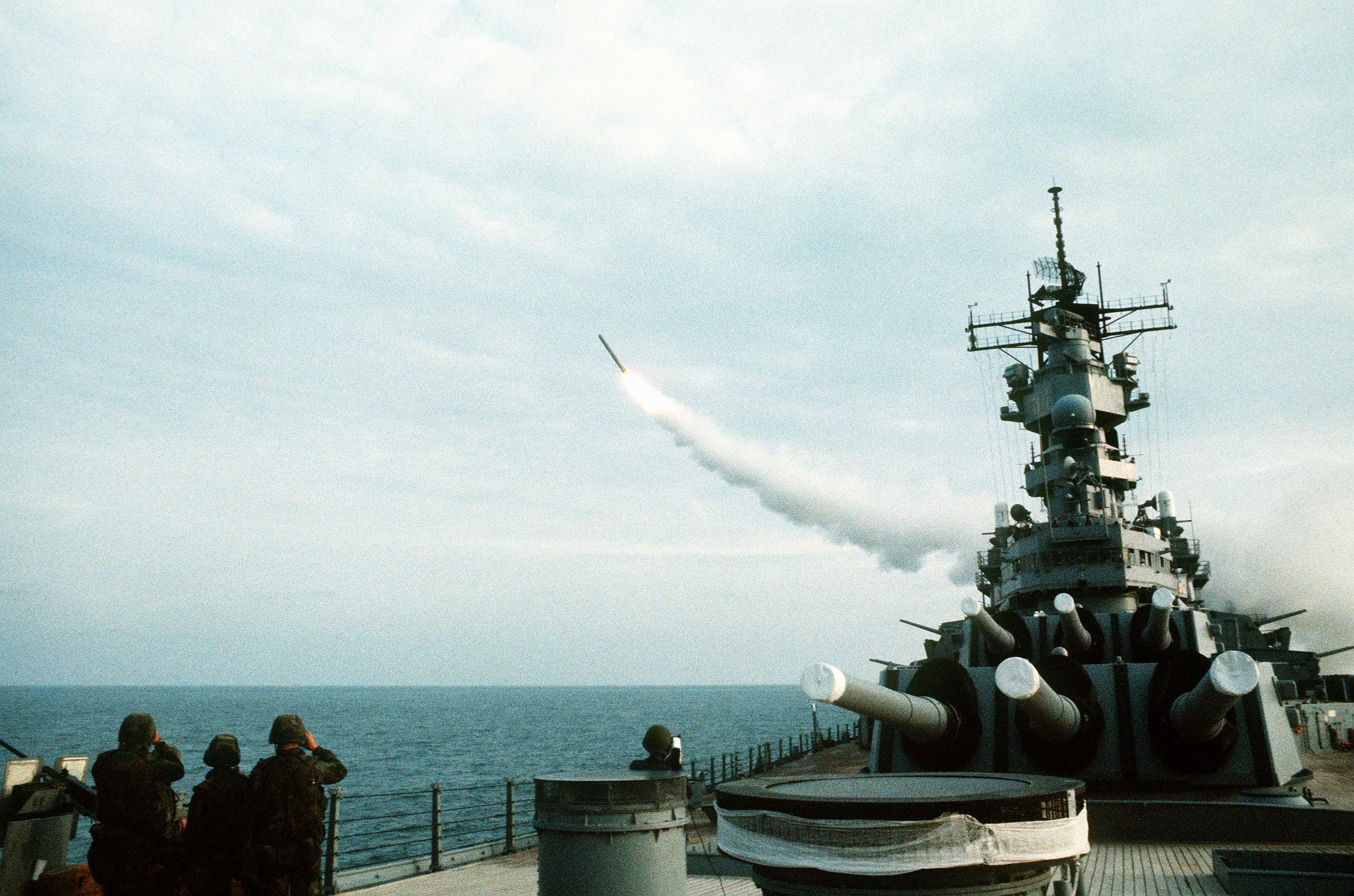
Wisconsin launches a BGM-109 Tomahawk missile during Operation Desert Storm

The four Iowa-class battleships, owing to their high speed, were the only vessels of the type to see significant combat action after World War II, primarily performing naval gunfire support. In this role, they would participate in the Korean War and Vietnam War before being mothballed. In the 1980s, as part of the US military buildup under President Ronald Reagan, the four ships were modernized to incorporate unmanned aerial vehicles (UAV) for shell spotting as well as cruise missiles, and in their modernized form, they participated in military action off the coast of Lebanon in 1982 and in the Gulf War. With the end of the Cold War and decreasing military budgets, the Iowa-class battleships were finally retired in 1992 and preserved as museum ships.

== Fleets ==
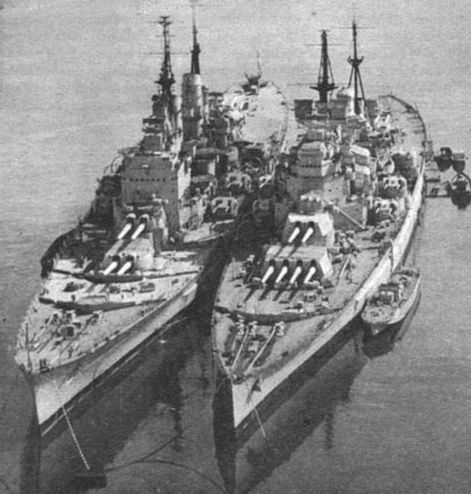
The British battleships Vanguard (left) and Howe (right) moored alongside each other. These were the last two battleships to be commissioned by the Royal Navy and were among the last battleships to be completed.

The following classes of warship have been considered to be fast battleships, in accordance with the definition used in this article and/or with contemporary usage. The list includes all new construction of the 1930s and 1940s, along with some reconstructions; this reflects the fact that, while not all of these ships were notably fast by contemporary standards of new construction, they were all much faster than the considerable number of capital ships built in the pre-treaty era and still in service at that time. All speeds are design speeds, sourced from Conway's; these speeds were often exceeded on trial, though rarely in service.

=== Royal Navy ===
- Queen Elizabeth class (24 knots): the prototype fast battleship class
- Hood (32 knots), the sole member of the Admiral class, was characterised by the Royal Navy as a battlecruiser throughout her lifetime; nonetheless some modern authorities characterise her as a fast battleship, as she appeared on paper to be an improvement over the Queen Elizabeth class.
- King George V class (28 knots)
- Vanguard (30 knots)

=== United States Navy ===
- North Carolina class (28 knots)
- South Dakota class (27.5 knots)
- Iowa class (33 knots)

=== Imperial Japanese Navy ===
- Kongō class – as reconstructed (30.5 knots). Originally classified as battlecruisers, these ships were reclassified as battleships after their first reconstruction in 1929–1931. Even after a second reconstruction in the late 1930s, they remained relatively weak in armament and protection by Second World War standards.
- Nagato class – as completed (26.5 knots). Unusually for a Japanese design, the speed was reduced to 25 knots (46 km/h; 29 mph) when the class was reconstructed in 1934–1936.
- Yamato class (27 knots)

=== German Navy ===
- Scharnhorst class (also known as the Gneisenau class) (31 knots). These ships were officially designated Schlachtschiffe (battleships). The contemporary Royal Navy termed them "battlecruisers", on the basis of their exceptionally high speed and weak armament.
- Bismarck class (30.8 knots)

=== French Navy ===
- Dunkerque class (29.5 knots). As with the Gneisenau class, the Royal Navy termed these ships "battlecruisers".
- Richelieu class (32 knots)

=== Royal Italian Navy ===
- Conte di Cavour class – as reconstructed, 1933–1937 (27 knots)
- Andrea Doria class – as reconstructed, 1937–1940 (26 knots)
- Littorio class (30 knots).
