= K1000 =

K1000 may refer to:

- K1000 rally, motorsports event in India
- K-1000, headphones by AKG Acoustics
- K-1000 battleship, Soviet ship hoax
- K1000, keyboard and music software by Kurzweil Music Systems
- Pentax K1000, a camera
