= Anglo-Soviet Naval Agreement =

1937 treaty between Britain and the Soviet Union

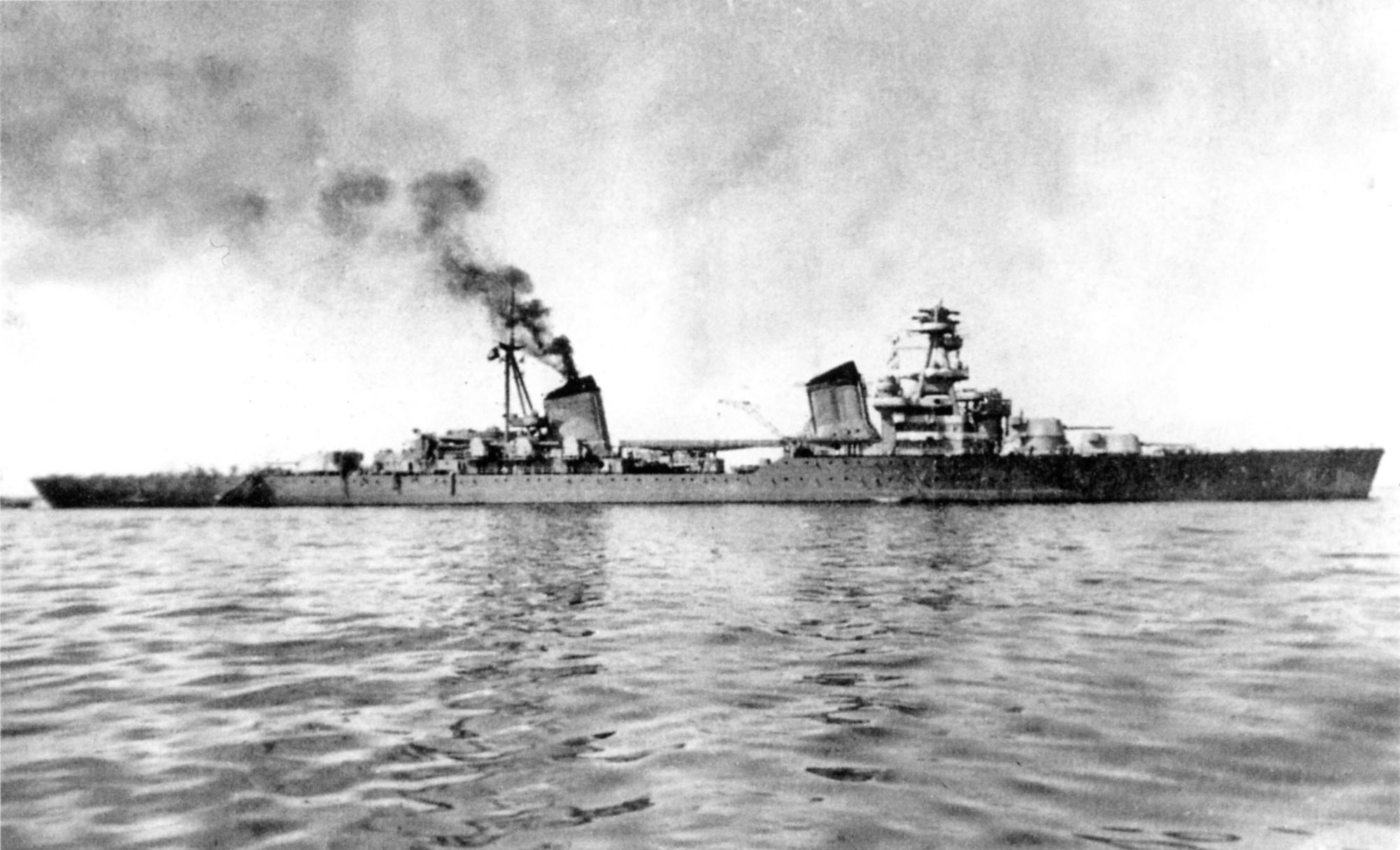
- The Soviet cruiser Kirov in 1941. Maisky sought ten ships of her class for the Baltic.
- Type: Naval limitation agreement
- Signed: July 17, 1937
- Location: London, United Kingdom
- Effective: November 4, 1937
- Expiration: December 31, 1942 (as written)
- Signatories: Anthony Eden; Duff Cooper; Ivan Maisky; L. Antsipo-Chikunsky
- Parties: United Kingdom; Soviet Union
- Language: English and Russian

The Anglo-Soviet Naval Agreement was a bilateral treaty between the United Kingdom and the Soviet Union. It was signed in London on July 17, 1937. It limited the size and armament of warships and provided for the two governments to exchange information on naval construction. It was concluded on the same day as a parallel agreement with Germany, and both were meant to extend the terms of the Second London Naval Treaty of 1936 to powers that had not taken part in the London conference. The Soviet Union received an exception for its Far Eastern fleet until it reached a special agreement with Japan.

After the talks ran for ten months, they nearly collapsed in March 1937, when Moscow briefly withdrew. The agreement finally came into force on November 4, 1937. Soviet officials later sent Britain false information about their building plans. Britain suspended its obligations under the agreement soon after the Second World War began.

== Background ==
During the 1930s, the British Admiralty viewed naval diplomacy as a tool to restrict the expansion of competing fleets while British shipyards worked to rebuild their own forces. Rather than relying on overall tonnage ratios, the Admiralty focused on establishing qualitative limits for specific warship categories. This strategy led to the Anglo-German Naval Agreement in June 1935 and the London Naval Treaty on March 25, 1936. Under the 1935 pact, Germany agreed to cap its naval strength at 35 percent of Britain's total tonnage and committed to the qualitative constraints set by the upcoming London treaty. Britain, France and the United States signed the London treaty, but Japan and Italy did not. Britain then opened talks with states that had not attended the conference, including Germany and the Soviet Union.

Britain needed competing navies, like the growing fleet of the Soviet Union, to accept the same limits on their new vessels. British officials worried that unchecked Soviet expansion would motivate Japan to enlarge its own fleet, triggering a corresponding buildup by the United States. They also doubted that Germany would accept a growing Soviet navy. Because German participation depended on Soviet participation, the whole scheme seemed to rest on a Soviet signature. Moscow was deeply dissatisfied with the 1935 Anglo-German pact, viewing it as a contradiction of assurances Anthony Eden had provided.

Soviet objectives were different. Joseph Stalin was committed to the strategy of building an ocean-going fleet. Historian Joseph Maiolo argues that Moscow wanted British naval technology and help in building it. Ambassador Ivan Maisky agreed to talks in April 1936.

== Discussions ==
Discussions began at the Foreign Office in May 1936, headed by Robert Craigie on behalf of Britain. Maisky requested that the Far Eastern fleet be exempted from limitations, that the Soviet Union be permitted two or three battleships equipped with 15- or 16-inch guns and that it be allowed to construct ten Kirov-class cruisers for the Baltic. Britain agreed to the Far Eastern exemption, partly because it believed Soviet shipyards would produce little over the next decade. The cruisers were what Maiolo calls a "thornier issue" because Germany and the Soviet Union each tied its heavy cruisers to the other's, while main gun caliber remained disputed through late 1936. Meanwhile, Soviet orders to British suppliers for naval hardware set Laurence Collier of the Foreign Office against the Admiralty, which sought restrictions.

On March 8, 1937, Maisky informed Craigie that Moscow would not sign, citing the unreliability of German commitments and Japan's remaining outside any limit. Without Soviet participation, Germany would not sign, preventing Britain from ratifying the London treaty. On March 23 Maisky told Eden that his government would sign after all. The reasons for this reversal remain uncertain. Historian Keith Neilson suggests the initial refusal may have been a way to pressure London into approving the Soviet naval orders faster.

Negotiations continued for four additional months, focusing largely on cruisers. By June, Moscow reduced its request to seven cruisers, provided Germany maintained no more than three heavy cruisers. Maxim Litvinov advised Stalin that in practice the limits on the main guns of battleships and cruisers were a dead letter. He saw no reason to withhold assent so long as Germany signed too, and Stalin agreed. The treaties with both the Soviet Union and Germany were signed on July 17, 1937.

== Provisions ==
The treaty mirrored the 1936 London treaty with some important modifications. The main limits were:

- Capital ships: 35,000 tons and 16-inch guns. The maximum caliber was raised from 14 inches after Japan rejected the lower threshold.
- Aircraft carriers: 23,000 tons.
- Cruisers: none exceeding 8,000 tons or bearing guns above 6.1 inches prior to 1943, though either signatory could build the larger-gunned type after giving notice, allowing the other to follow suit.
- Submarines: 2,000 tons.

Each government agreed to share its annual naval construction schedule and technical details of individual ships four months prior to laying their keels. Either nation could exceed the boundaries if a third power surpassed them, and either could suspend compliance during wartime.

The Soviet Far Eastern fleet was exempt from the limits until the Soviet Union reached an agreement with Japan, though Moscow undertook not to exceed them unless Japan or another Far Eastern power did so first. Vessels built beyond limits for the Far East could not be transferred to the Baltic or Black Sea. The treaty was intended to run through December 31, 1942, and depended on the simultaneous entry into force of the Anglo-German agreement.

== Implementation and termination ==
The Soviet Union soon planned vessels exceeding treaty limits, including a capital ship approaching 60,000 tons. Its 1938 reporting arrived seven months late and contained false battleship specifications. British naval intelligence accepted Moscow's official tables.

Following Japan's abandonment of naval restraint, the capital ship limit was increased to 45,000 tons in 1938, and a protocol dated July 6, 1938, extended this revision to the Soviet agreement. Adolf Hitler repudiated the Anglo-German agreement in April 1939. On August 24, the day after the Nazi-Soviet pact, the Admiralty concluded that denouncing the treaties was the only feasible option. On September 6, 1939, three days after entering the Second World War, Britain formally notified the other governments that its obligations were suspended indefinitely.

== Historical evaluation ==
Neilson views the treaty as having limited impact, given Japan's war in China and Germany's evasion of its commitments, but notes that the negotiations demonstrated the Soviet Union could not be ignored in British strategic policy. Maiolo concludes that London and Moscow worked at cross-purposes, with Britain rationing its naval technology and Soviet officers sending false data. Historian Greg Kennedy argues that the difficult talks with Moscow strengthened the British belief that rearmament, not arms limitation, was the best way to protect the empire.
