= Sovetsky Soyuz-class battleship =

Planned class of Soviet battleships

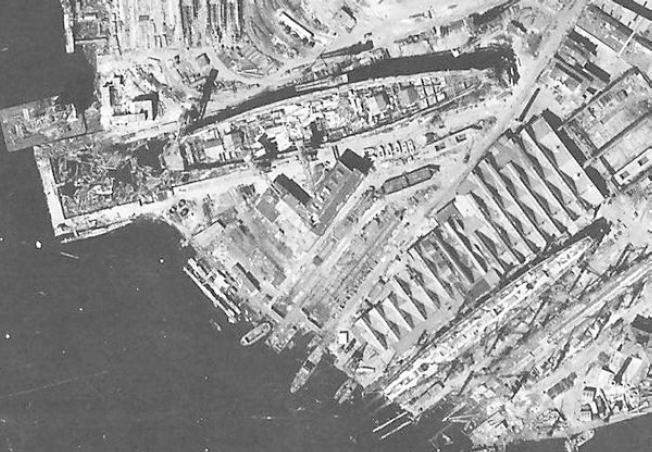
- German reconnaissance picture of Sovetsky Soyuz taken in June 1942

Class overview
- Operators: Soviet Navy
- Preceded by: Imperator Nikolai I
- Succeeded by: Project 24
- Cost: 1,180,000,000 rubles (for all 4 ships laid down)
- Built: 1938–1941
- Planned: 15 (4 laid down before cancellation)
- Canceled: 15

General characteristics after 1941 modifications
- Type: Battleship
- Displacement: 59,150 t (58,220 long tons) (standard); 65,150 t (64,120 long tons) (full load)
- Length: 269.4 m (883 ft 10 in) (o/a)
- Beam: 38.9 m (127 ft 7 in)
- Draft: 10.4 m (34 ft 1 in)
- Installed power: 6 triangle-type boilers; 201,000 shp (150,000 kW)
- Propulsion: 3 shafts; 3 geared steam turbines
- Speed: 28 knots (52 km/h; 32 mph)
- Endurance: 7,680 nmi (14,220 km; 8,840 mi) at 14 knots (26 km/h; 16 mph)
- Armament: 3 × triple 406 mm (16 in) guns; 6 × twin 152 mm (6 in) guns; 6 × twin 100 mm (3.9 in) DP guns; 10 × quadruple 37 mm (1.5 in) AA guns
- Armor: Waterline belt: 180–420 mm (7.1–16.5 in); Deck: 25–155 mm (1.0–6.1 in); Turrets: 230–495 mm (9.1–19.5 in); Barbettes: 425 mm (16.7 in); Bulkheads: 75–365 mm (3.0–14.4 in); Conning tower: 425 mm (16.7 in)
- Aircraft carried: 4 KOR-2 flying boats
- Aviation facilities: 2 aircraft catapults

The Sovetsky Soyuz-class battleships (Project 23, Russian: Советский Союз, 'Soviet Union') were a class of battleships begun by the Soviet Union in the late 1930s but never brought into service.

Designed in response to the Bismarck-class battleships being built by Germany, they would have rivaled the Imperial Japanese Yamato class and America's planned Montana class in size, although with less firepower: nine 406 mm (16 in) guns compared to the nine 460 mm (18.1 in) guns of the Japanese ships and a dozen 16 in (406 mm) on the Montanas. The failure of the Soviet armor plate industry to build cemented armor plates thicker than 230 mm (9.1 in) would have negated any combat advantages from the Sovetsky Soyuz class's thicker armor.

The Soviets contemplated building as many as fifteen Sovetsky Soyuz-class battleships, but eleven of them were never laid down, and construction of the first four was plagued with difficulties as the Soviet shipbuilding and related industries were not prepared to build such large ships. One was cancelled on 19 October 1940 after the discovery of serious construction flaws, and the other three were suspended shortly after Nazi Germany invaded the Soviet Union in June 1941. All three of the surviving hulls were scrapped in the late 1940s.

== Design and development ==
Design work began in 1935 on new battleships in response to the existing and planned German battleships, and the Soviets made extensive efforts in Italy and the United States to purchase either drawings or the ships themselves in the late 1930s. The Italian firm of Gio. Ansaldo & C. proposed a ship of 42,000 long tons (43,000 t) standard displacement with nine 16-inch (406 mm) guns, in size and appearance similar to the Italian battleship Littorio then under construction by the company. The U.S. firm of Gibbs & Cox provided four designs; one for a conventional battleship, and three hybrid designs which combined battleship main armament with a raised flight deck on the central superstructure capable of operating up to 30 aircraft. While these projects proved useful to the Soviets, they decided to proceed with their own.

The first Tactical-Technical Requirement (abbreviated in Russian as ТТZ) for the large battleship design was issued on 21 February 1936 but proved too ambitious, specifying nine 460 mm guns and a speed of 36 knots (67 km/h; 41 mph) on a displacement of 55,000 tons. (Note: Aside from the ship's specifications themselves the type of ton is not specified by McLaughlin.) The TTZ was revised in May 1936 by Admiral Vladimir Orlov, Commander of the Soviet Navy, reducing speed to 30 knots (56 km/h; 35 mph), and weakening the secondary and anti-aircraft batteries. A few months later Admiral Orlov further reduced the size of the battleship to 45,000 tons and set the size of the main guns at 406 mm. Shortly afterward, the Soviet Union signed the Anglo-Soviet Quantitative Naval Agreement of 1937 and agreed to follow the terms of the Second London Naval Treaty that limited battleships to a displacement of 35,560 metric tons (35,000 long tons), although they did add a proviso that allowed them to build ships of unlimited size to face the Imperial Japanese Navy if they notified the British. Yet another TTZ was approved by Orlov on 3 August for ships of 41,500 tons with an armament of nine 406-mm, twelve 152 mm (6 in), twelve 100 mm (3.9 in), and forty 37 mm (1.5 in) guns, a maximum armor thickness of 380 mm (15 in) and a speed of 30 knots.

The design of KB-4, the surface ship design bureau of the Baltic Shipyard, was selected for further development although the lead designers were convinced that only a larger ship could fulfill the ambitious requirements. They did manage to get agreement on 22 November 1936 for a thickening of the deck armor that raised the displacement to about 47,000 tons. Design work continued on this basis and technical work was completed for a ship of 47,700 tons in April 1937, but the designers continued to press their case for larger ships. The issue was resolved by General Secretary Stalin at a meeting on 4 July when he agreed to increase displacement to about 56,000 tons. This forced the project to begin again.

The timing of the redesign proved to be inauspicious as the Great Purge was spreading through the ranks of the military and related industries. The original deadline for completion of design work by 15 October was missed, and an incomplete version was presented to the navy's Shipbuilding Administration the next month. A number of details remained to be worked out, including the final design of the machinery plant, the 152 mm guns and the 100 mm gun mounts. In the meantime, extensive and expensive testing was conducted on the ship's hull form, deck armor and torpedo protection; 27 million rubles were spent on experimental work in 1938 alone. Over 100 models of the hull were tested in a ship model basin to find the best hull form and two one-tenth-scale launches were built at Sevastopol to test the hull's maneuverability. An old German-built steamship, known as S-53, was fitted with a replica of the design's armor decks in late 1936. S-53 was tested against 500 kg (1,100 lb) bombs, proving that such ordnance would generally penetrate both the 40 mm (1.6 in) upper and 50 mm (2 in) middle decks before exploding on the armored deck. The main armor deck was raised one deck in consequence and a splinter deck added underneath it to stop any bomb or shell fragments that might penetrate the armor deck. The underwater protection system was tested on fifteen one-fifth scale models and two full-sized experimental barges. These tests proved that the torpedo belt system of multiple bulkheads was superior to the Pugliese system of a large tube filled with smaller sealed tubes, but it was too late to incorporate these test results into the design as construction was well underway by the time they were completed in late 1939.

A revised design was approved on 28 February 1938 and the first ship was to be laid down on 15 July, but even this design was incomplete and would be revised later. Trials with similarly shaped motor launches suggested that the hull's propulsive efficiency would be 1 knot (1.9 km/h; 1.2 mph) less than planned, and this was accepted in the November 1938 revision as a maximum speed of 27.5 knots (50.9 km/h; 31.6 mph). However, a new propeller design proved to be more efficient and was predicted to increase speed to 28 knots (52 km/h; 32 mph). Another change was the deletion of the centerline rudder when tests showed that the two wing rudders would not be able to counteract its effects if it jammed. The weight toward the stern of the boat was calculated to be too great, producing a substantial stern-down trim. To remedy this, the two 100 mm turrets mounted on the quarterdeck were deleted and the height of the armor belt abreast the rear turret was lowered, but this decision was reversed and they were restored by a decision of the State Defense Committee on 14 January 1941. This forced a revision of the aircraft arrangements as the aircraft catapult had to be removed from the centerline of the quarterdeck; two catapults were added to the sides of the quarterdeck instead.

=== General characteristics ===
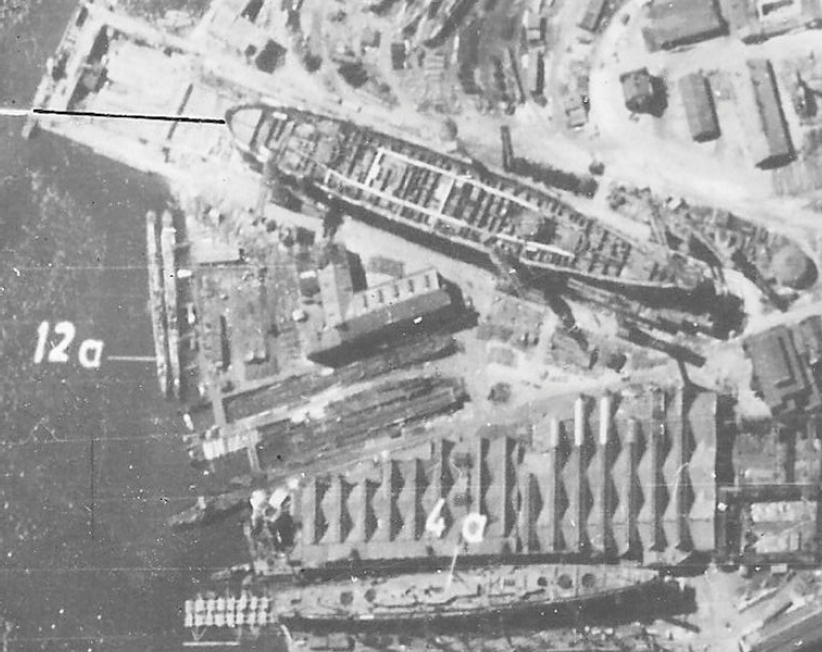
Luftwaffe aerial reconnaissance photo of the Ordzhonikidze Yard (Shipyard 189), Leningrad, showing the battleship Sovetsky Soyuz (top) and the cruiser Chkalov under construction, 26 June 1941

As designed, the Project 23-class ships, as Sovetsky Soyuz and her sisters were designated, were 269.4 m (883 ft 10 in) long overall. They had a beam of 38.9 m (127 ft 7 in) and a draft of 10.4 m (34 ft 1 in) at deep load. They displaced 59,150 metric tons (58,220 long tons) at standard load and 65,150 t (64,121 long tons) at full load, although weight estimates made in 1940 show that they would have exceeded 60,000 t (59,052 long tons) standard and 67,000 t (65,942 long tons) at full load.

The hull form was very full-bodied, especially at the forward magazines, where the torpedo protection system added width to the beam. Coupled with the relatively low length-to-beam ratio of 7.14:1, this meant that very powerful turbines were necessary to achieve even modest speeds. Stalin's decision that the Project 23-class ships would use three propeller shafts instead of four increased the load on each shaft and reduced propulsive efficiency, although it did shorten the length of the armored citadel and thus overall displacement. Metacentric height was designed at 3.4 m (11 ft 2 in) and the tactical diameter was estimated at 1,170 m (3,840 ft).

The Sovetsky Soyuz-class ships were provided with facilities to handle two to four KOR-2 flying boats which would be launched by the two catapults mounted on the stern. Two hangars were built into the after end of the forecastle deck to house two of them and cranes were provided at the forward end of the quarterdeck to hoist them out of the water.

=== Machinery ===
According to naval historian Stephen McLaughlin, the machinery arrangement "provided good dispersal of the machinery spaces, but at the cost of very long runs for the wing shafts" of approximately 105 m (344.5 ft). The turbine compartments for the wing shafts were located forward of boiler room No. 1 and aft of the No. 2 turret magazines. The engine room for the center shaft's turbine was between boiler room No. 2 and No. 3. This meant that the wing propeller shafts had to run underneath the boilers.

The steam turbines, and a license to build them, were originally going to be ordered from Cammell Laird in the United Kingdom, but their £700,000 cost was more than the Soviets wanted to pay. Instead they bought them from Brown Boveri, using the technical information acquired from Cammell Laird in the process, for £400,000. Four single-reduction, impulse-reduction geared turbines were ordered from the Swiss firm, three to equip Sovetskaya Rossiya and one to serve as a pattern for the factory in Kharkov that was to build the remainder. The three produced a total of 201,000 shaft horsepower (149,886 kW). Six triangle-type water-tube boilers—two in each boiler room—powered the turbines at a working pressure of 37 kg/cm^{2} (3,628 kPa; 526 psi) and a temperature of 380 °C (716 °F).

Maximum speed was estimated at 28 knots, using the revised propeller design, although forcing the machinery would yield an extra knot. The normal fuel oil capacity was 5,280 t (5,197 long tons), giving an estimated endurance of 6,300 nautical miles (11,700 km; 7,200 mi) at 14.5 knots (26.9 km/h; 16.7 mph) and 1,890 nautical miles (3,500 km; 2,170 mi) at full speed. Maximum fuel capacity was 6,440 t (6,338 long tons) which gave a range of 7,680 nautical miles (14,220 km; 8,840 mi) at 14.5 knots and 2,305 nautical miles (4,269 km; 2,653 mi) at full speed.

=== Armament ===
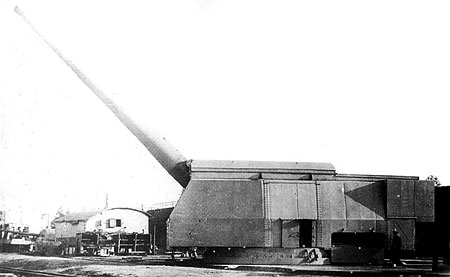
406 mm B-37 gun in MP-10 test mount, 1940

The main armament consisted of three electrically powered MK-1 triple turrets, each with three 50-caliber 406 mm B-37 guns. The guns could be depressed to −2° and elevated to 45°. They had a fixed loading angle of 6° and their rate of fire varied with the time required to re-aim the guns. It ranged from 2.0 to 2.6 rounds per minute depending on the elevation. The turrets could elevate at a rate of 6.2 degrees per second and traverse at 4.55 degrees per second. 100 rounds per gun were carried. The guns fired 1,108-kilogram (2,443 lb) projectiles at a muzzle velocity of 830 m/s (2,700 ft/s); this provided a maximum range of 45,600 meters (49,900 yd).

The secondary armament consisted of twelve 57-caliber B-38 152 mm guns mounted in six twin-gun MK-4 turrets. Their elevation limits were −5° to +45° with a fixed loading angle of 8°. Their rate of fire also varied with the elevation from 7.5 to 4.8 rounds per minute. They were provided with 170 rounds per gun. The turrets could elevate at a rate of 13 degrees per second and traverse at 6 degrees per second. They had a maximum range of about 30,000 meters (98,425 ft) with a 55-kilogram (121 lb) shell at a muzzle velocity of 950 m/s (3,100 ft/s).

Heavy anti-aircraft (AA) fire was provided by a dozen 56-caliber 100 mm B-34 dual-purpose guns in six twin-gun MZ-14 turrets with 400 rounds per gun. The ships began construction with only four turrets, but two additional turrets were restored to the quarterdeck in January 1941. They could elevate to a maximum of 85° and depress to −8°. They could traverse at a rate of 12° per second and elevate at 10° per second. They fired 15.6-kilogram (34 lb) high explosive shells at a muzzle velocity of 895 m/s (2,940 ft/s); this provided a maximum range of 22,241 m (24,323 yd) against surface targets, but their maximum range against aerial targets was 9,895 m (32,464 ft), the limit of their time fuse.

Light AA defense was handled by ten quadruple, water-cooled, 46-K mounts fitted with 37 mm (1.5 in) 70-K guns with 1800 rounds per gun. Initially only eight mounts were planned when the ships began construction, but two more were added later, probably in January 1941, one on each side of the forward superstructure. Each mount was fully enclosed to protect the crew from the muzzle blast of the larger guns and against splinters. The guns fired .732 kg (1.61 lb) shells at a muzzle velocity of 880 m/s (2,900 ft/s). Their effective anti-aircraft range was 4,000 m (13,123 ft).

=== Fire control ===
Each main gun turret was given a DM-12 12 m (39 ft 4 in) rangefinder for use in local control, but they were generally controlled by one of three KDP-8 fire-control directors. These had two 8 m (26 ft 3 in) stereoscopic rangefinders, one to track the target and the other to measure the range to the ship's own shell splashes. Two of these were protected by 20 mm (0.8 in) of armor and were mounted atop the rear superstructure and the tower-mast. The other was mounted on top of the conning tower and was protected by 50 mm of armor. They used a TsAS-0 mechanical computer to generate firing solutions. Four KDP-4t-II directors, with two 4 m (13 ft 1 in) rangefinders each, controlled the secondary armament. One pair was on either side of the tower-mast and the aft pair was on each side of the aft funnel. Three SPN-300 stabilized directors, each with a 4-meter rangefinder, controlled the heavy anti-aircraft guns. There was one on each side of the forward funnel while the other was atop the rear superstructure.

=== Protection ===
Soviet armor plate plants proved incapable of producing plates of cemented armor thicker than 230 mm (9.1 in) which forced the decision to replace cemented plates thicker than 200 mm (7.9 in) with case-hardened ones with less resistance in November 1940. The plants tended to compensate by making the thicker plates harder, but this often made them more brittle and large numbers did not pass the acceptance tests. This would have significantly reduced the level of protection enjoyed by the Sovetsky Soyuz-class ships in combat.

The Sovetsky Soyuz-class ships devoted a total weight of 23,306 metric tons (22,938 long tons) to armor protection, a slightly greater weight than that of the larger Japanese Yamato class (23,262 t (22,895 long tons)). Their armor was intended to resist 406 mm shells and 500 kg bombs, specifically shells fired from forward bearings between 35° and 50° from the centerline. This led to the very unusual situation where the armor belt thickened toward the bow to compensate for the narrowing of the ship near the forward magazines, which had to be compensated for by thicker armor. The belt was 148.4 m (486 ft 11 in) long and covered 57% of the total waterline length. It was inclined 5° to increase its resistance to flat-trajectory shells. Over the machinery spaces it was 375 mm (14.8 in) thick and increased in steps until it was 420 mm (17 in) thick over the forward magazines. It was 380 mm (15 in) over the rear magazine. The belt armor was carried forward of the magazines at a thickness of 220 mm (8.7 in) and terminated in a steeply sloped (30°) transverse 285 mm (11.2 in) bulkhead that reduced to 250 mm (9.8 in) at the lower deck where it was continued down to the inner bottom by a 75 mm (3 in) bulkhead. Forward of this bulkhead was a 20 mm splinter belt that continued all the way to the bow. The main armor belt dropped down to the main deck from the upper deck abreast the aft turret to reduce weight. This "step" was protected by 180 mm (7.1 in) plates. A 365-millimeter (14.4 in) transverse bulkhead separated the rear turret and the ship's sides. The main part of the armored citadel was closed off by a 230 mm forward bulkhead and a 180 mm rear bulkhead, both of homogeneous armor. Splinter armor 25 mm (0.98 in) thick covered the upper portion of the citadel.

The forecastle deck was 25 mm thick while the upper deck was 155 mm (6.1 in) over the citadel. Below it, the 50 mm middle deck acted as a splinter deck. The upper deck was 100 mm thick above the 220 mm waterline belt extension. The bottom edge of the forward splinter belt met with a 65 mm (2.6 in) arched deck. Another arched deck of the same thickness covered the stern aft of the rear transverse bulkhead.

The main gun turrets had faces 495 mm (19.5 in) thick with sides and roofs 230 mm thick. 180 mm (7.1 in) thick plates protected the gun ports and 60 mm (2.4 in) bulkheads separated each gun. The barbettes were 425 mm (16.7 in) thick above the upper deck. The MK-4 turrets had 100 mm faces and 65 mm sides. Their barbettes were 100 mm in thickness, but reduced to 65 mm on their inboard sides. 100 mm of armor protected the faces, sides and backs of the MZ-14 turrets for the 100 mm guns, but their roofs and barbettes were 100 mm thick. The forward conning tower had walls 425 mm thick while the rear conning tower had only 220 mm (8.7 in). The flag bridge in the tower-mast had 75 mm (3.0 in) of protection.

The torpedo defense system was designed to withstand torpedoes with warheads equivalent to 750 kg (1,653 lb) of TNT. The ships were intended to be able to remain afloat with any five adjacent compartments flooded or with three torpedo hits and the destruction of the unarmored above-water side. The Pugliese system protected 123 m (403 ft 7 in) of the ships' midsection. At the aft end was a multi-bulkhead protection system that extended another 33 m (108 ft 3 in) to the rear from the Pugliese system. The depth of the system was 8.2 m (26 ft 11 in) amidships, but it reduced to 7 m (23 ft) fore and aft. The outer plating ranged from 11 to 14 mm (0.43 to 0.55 in) in thickness while the inner bottom was 7 mm (0.28 in) thick. The cylinder of the Pugliese system was also 7 mm thick while the semi-circular main bulkhead was 35 mm (1.4 in) thick with a flat 10 mm (0.39 in) bulkhead behind it. The 3.15 m (10 ft 4 in) diameter cylinder was intended to be immersed in fuel oil or water.

== Construction ==
The August 1938 shipbuilding plan envisioned a total of 15 Project 23-class battleships. This grandiose scheme was slightly revised downward to 14 ships in the August 1939 plan. Eight ships were to be laid down before 1942 and the remaining six before 1947. However, only four were actually laid down before the outbreak of World War II forced the Soviets to reassess their ambitious plans. On 19 October 1940 an order was issued, signed by Stalin and Molotov, that no new battleships be laid down in order to concentrate on building smaller ships (and also, probably, because more resources were required for the Army). One ship was to be scrapped, and priority should be given to only one of the three remaining battleships.

The Soviet shipbuilding and related industries proved to be incapable of supporting the construction of so many large ships at the same time. The largest warships built in the Soviet Union prior to 1938 were the 8,000-metric-ton (7,874-long-ton) Kirov-class cruisers, and even they had suffered from a number of production problems, but the Soviet leadership appeared to ignore the difficulties encountered in the construction of the Kirov class when ordering 14 much more ambitious ships. Construction of two more ships planned for Leningrad and Mykolaiv had to move to the brand-new Shipyard Nr. 402 in Molotovsk because the existing shipyards could not be expanded to handle so many large ships. Components for these two ships had to be manufactured at Leningrad and shipped via the White Sea–Baltic Canal to Molotovsk. Also, the turret shop at Mykolaiv proved to be too poorly equipped to assemble the 406 mm mountings and the propeller shafts had to be ordered in 1940 from Germany and the Netherlands as the domestic plants were already overburdened with orders. Shipbuilding steel proved to be in short supply in 1940, and a number of batches were rejected because they did not meet specifications. Armor plate production was even more problematic as only 1,800 metric tons (1,772 long tons) of the anticipated 10,000 metric tons (9,842 long tons) were delivered in 1939, and more than half of that was rejected. Furthermore, the armor plants proved to be incapable of making cemented plates over 230 mm, and inferior face-hardened plates had to substitute for all thicknesses over 200 mm.

Machinery problems were likely to delay the ships well past their intended delivery dates of 1943–1944. Three turbines were delivered by Brown Boveri in 1939 to Arkhangelsk for Sovetskaya Rossiya, but the Kharkhovskii Turbogenerator Works never completed a single turbine before the German invasion in June 1941. A prototype boiler was supposed to have been built ashore for evaluation, but it was not completed until early 1941, which further complicated the production plan.

Construction of all three ships was ordered halted on 10 July 1941, and Sovetsky Soyuz was placed into long-term conservation as the most advanced ship. However, all three were officially struck from the Navy List on 10 September 1941.

=== Sovetsky Soyuz ===
Sovetsky Soyuz (Советский Союз–Soviet Union) was formally laid down 15 July 1938 in Shipyard Nr. 189 (Ordzhonikidze) in Leningrad, although evidence suggests that construction actually began in January 1939 after her slipway was completed, the necessary cranes were in place, and working drawings had been completed. When the war began she was estimated to be 21.19% complete, with 15,818 metric tons (15,568 long tons) of steel assembled on the slip. She was only lightly damaged by German air attacks and bombardments, and, as some material had been used during the siege of Leningrad, she was estimated to be 19.5% complete after the end of the war. Some thought was given to completing her, but this was opposed as she was regarded as obsolete in light of the experience gained during the war. Stalin's expressed desire to see one of the Project 23-class ships completed only delayed the decision to scrap her; this was ordered on 29 May 1948 and was well underway by April 1949.

=== Sovetskaya Ukraina ===
Sovetskaya Ukraina (Советская Украина–Soviet Ukraine) was laid down 31 October 1938 at Shipyard Nr. 198 (Marti South) in Mykolaiv. When the war began she was 17.98% complete, with 13,001 metric tons (12,796 long tons) assembled on the slipway. Some effort was made to launch the hull, but little work had been done to dredge the river at the foot of the slipway, and she was captured on 18 August 1941, although retreating Soviet troops slightly damaged her hull. The Germans dismantled 200 feet (61 m) of her bow and 100 feet (30 m) of her stern for use in fortifications. They were forced to evacuate Mykolaiv on 17 March 1944 and demolished the supporting blocks under her port side before they left, which gave her a list between 5 and 10 degrees and made her a total loss. She was ordered scrapped on 27 March 1947.

=== Sovetskaya Rossiya ===
Sovetskaya Rossiya (Советская Россия–Soviet Russia) was laid down on 22 July 1940 in Shipyard Nr. 402 in Molotovsk. After the end of the war she was only 0.97% complete, with 2,125 metric tons (2,091 long tons) of steel assembled. She was ordered scrapped on 27 March 1947.

=== Sovetskaya Belorussiya ===
Sovetskaya Belorussiya (Советская Белоруссия–Soviet Belorussia) was laid down 21 December 1939 at Shipyard Nr. 402 in Molotovsk, but construction was suspended in mid-1940 when it was discovered that 70,000 rivets used in her hull plating were of inferior quality. This fact probably influenced the decision to cancel her on 19 October 1940. Material intended for her construction was used to construct a floating battery for the defense of Leningrad.

=== Sovetskaya Gruziya ===
Sovetskaya Gruziya (Советская Грузия-Soviet Georgia) was planned to be laid down in 1941 at the Baltic Works. It was cancelled because of the invasion of the Soviet Union in June of that year.

== See also ==
- K-1000 battleship, a purported class of Soviet battleships to succeed Sovetsky Soyuz, promulgated hoax of the Soviet government.

== Bibliography ==
- Braynard, Frank O. (1968). By Their Works Ye Shall Know Them: The Life and Ships of William Francis Gibbs 1886–1967. New York: Gibbs & Cox. OCLC 1192704.
- Budzbon, Przemysław (1980). "Soviet Union". In Chesneau, Roger (ed.). Conway's All the World's Fighting Ships 1922–1946. Greenwich, UK: Conway Maritime Press. pp. 318–346. ISBN 0-85177-146-7.
- Budzbon, Przemysław; Radziemski, Jan & Twardowski, Marek (2022). Warships of the Soviet Fleets 1939–1945. Vol. I: Major Combatants. Annapolis, Maryland: Naval Institute Press. ISBN 978-1-68247-877-6.
- Friedman, Norman (2011). Naval Weapons of World War One: Guns, Torpedoes, Mines and ASW Weapons of All Nations: An Illustrated Directory. Barnsley, UK: Seaforth. ISBN 978-1-84832-100-7.
- Gribovskii, V. Iu. (1993). "The 'Sovietskii Soiuz' Class Battleships". Warship International. XXX (2): 150–169. ISSN 0043-0374.
- Ireland, Bernard (1996). Jane's Battleships of the 20th Century. London: HarperCollins. ISBN 0-00-470997-7.
- McLaughlin, Stephen (2003). Russian & Soviet Battleships. Annapolis, Maryland: Naval Institute Press. ISBN 1-55750-481-4.
- McLaughlin, Stephen (2021). "Stalin's Super-battleships: The Sovietskii Soyuz Class". In Jordan, John (ed.). Warship 2021. Oxford, UK: Osprey Publishing. pp. 8–28. ISBN 978-1-4728-4779-9.
- Rohwer, Jürgen & Monakov, Mikhail S. (2001). Stalin's Ocean-Going Fleet: Soviet Naval Strategy and Shipbuilding Programs 1935–1953. London: Frank Cass. ISBN 0-7146-4895-7.
- Westwood, J. N. (1994). Russian Naval Construction, 1905–45. London: Macmillan. ISBN 0-333-55553-8.
