= K-1000 battleship =

Fictional class of battleships of the Soviet Navy

Class overview
- Name: K-1000 Heavy Fleet Unit
- Operators: Soviet Navy (alleged)
- Preceded by: Sovetsky Soyuz class
- Planned: 7
- Canceled: 7

General characteristics
- Type: Battleship
- Displacement: 66,000–79,000 tonnes (65,000–78,000 long tons) (est.)
- Length: 297m
- Beam: 38m
- Speed: 28–33 knots (52–61 km/h; 32–38 mph) (est.)
- Armament: 12 × 410 mm (16.1 in) or 9 × 460 mm (18.1 in) guns; 2 × missile dome; 6 × twin 130 mm (5.1 in) guns; 8 × twin 45-millimeter (1.8 in) guns; 6 × quadruple 45-millimeter (1.8 in) guns; 12 × quadruple 25-millimeter (0.98 in) guns; 11 x single 25-millimeter (0.98 in) guns
- Armour: Waterline belt: 280–470 mm (11–19 in); Upper deck: 70–160 mm (2.8–6.3 in) each; Middle deck: 80–180 mm (3.1–7.1 in); Turrets: 190–410 mm (7.5–16.1 in); Barbettes: 235–285 mm (9.3–11.2 in); Secondary turrets: 35–55 mm (1.4–2.2 in); Conning tower: 210–250 mm (8.3–9.8 in); Bulkheads: 240–255 mm (9.4–10.0 in)

The K-1000 battleship (Russian: Линейные корабли типа К-1000, romanized: Lineynyye korabli tipa K-1000) was rumoured to be a type of advanced battleship produced by the Soviet Union at the beginning of the Cold War. Soviet intelligence agencies actively encouraged the circulation of rumours about the type, which were reprinted by several Western journals including Jane's Fighting Ships.

== History ==
Accounts of the new Soviet battleships appeared in journals in France, Germany and the US in the late 1940s and early 1950s. The rumours were unclear about the specifications of the ships. The main point of agreement between different descriptions was that the type carried guided missiles, mounted in distinctive domed turrets, in addition to a conventional heavy gun armament. The ships were often said to have been laid down in Siberian shipyards.

The displacement stated varied between 66,000 and 79,000 tonnes (65,000 and 78,000 long tons), and their speed was said to be anything between 28 and 33 knots. The main armament was normally said to be twelve 410-millimetre (16 in) guns, though sometimes nine 460-millimetre (18 in) guns were alleged.

The names assigned to the class were said to be Strana Sovetov ('Land of the Soviets'), Sovetskaya Byelorussia ('Soviet Belarussia'), Krasnaya Bessarabiya ('Red Bessarabia'), Krasnaya Sibir ('Red Siberia'), Sovietskaya Konstitutsia ('Soviet Constitution'), Lenin and Sovetsky Soyuz ('Soviet Union'). Many of the names were re-used from units of the authentic, but never completed, Sovetsky Soyuz class which were under construction when World War II broke out.

The Soviet Union actively perpetrated the hoax class of warships. A Soviet 'fleet recognition manual' planted in the West seemed to confirm the existence and general features of the K-1000 Heavy Fleet Unit Sovetskaya Byelorussia, and that she was in commission from 10 November 1953. The accompanying drawings, showing two missile domes, six heavy guns and a cluster of lighter armament, gave a further veneer of accuracy to the document. In fact the drawings were copied directly from the 1949–50 edition of Jane's Fighting Ships.

In reality, the USSR was (like other naval powers) retiring or scrapping its existing battleships, which had been rendered obsolete by the aircraft carrier. The United States Navy considered creating a 'missile battleship' out of the unfinished USS Kentucky, which would have had some similarities to the fictional K-1000 class; however, this plan never went ahead.

== See also ==
- List of aviation cruisers built in the Soviet Union
