= Second London Naval Treaty =

1936 international arms control treaty

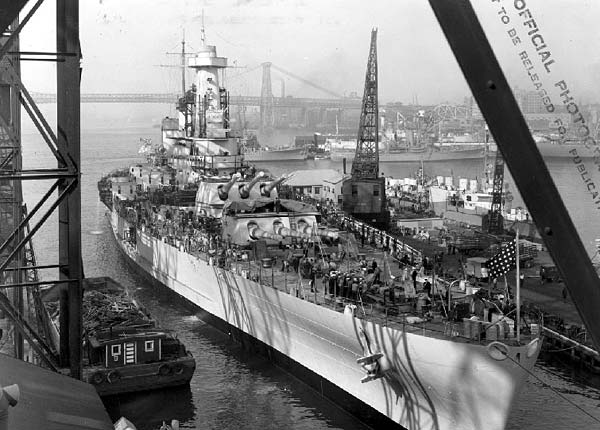
The displacement of the North Carolina (shown is the USS North Carolina) and South Dakota-classes were limited by the Second London Naval Treaty.

The Second London Naval Treaty was an international treaty intended to limit the growth in naval armaments prior to World War II. It was signed as a result of the Second London Naval Disarmament Conference held in London. The conference started on 9 December 1935 and the treaty was signed by the participating nations on 25 March 1936.

== Treaty ==
The signatories were France, the United States, and the major constituents of the British Empire: Australia, Canada, India, New Zealand, and the United Kingdom (on behalf of itself and "all parts of the British Empire which are not separate Members of the League of Nations"). Two Commonwealth Dominions declined to sign: South Africa and the Irish Free State, the latter because it had no navy. Japan, a signatory of the First London Naval Treaty soon to be at war on the Asian mainland, withdrew from the conference on 15 January. Italy also declined to sign the treaty, largely as a result of the controversy over its invasion of Abyssinia (Ethiopia); Italy was under sanctions from the League of Nations.

The conference was intended to limit the growth in naval armaments until its expiration in 1942. The absence of Japan, a very significant naval power, prevented agreement on a ceiling on the numbers of warships. The treaty did limit the maximum size of the signatories' ships, and the maximum calibre of the guns which they could carry. First of all, capital ships were restricted to a 35,000 long tons (35,562 t) standard displacement and 14-inch (356 mm) guns. However, a so-called "escalator clause" was included at the urging of American negotiators in case any of the countries that had signed the Washington Naval Treaty refused to adhere to this new limit. This provision allowed the signatory countries of the Second London Treaty—France, the United Kingdom and the United States—to raise the limit from 14-inch guns to 16-inch if Japan or Italy still refused to sign after 1 April 1937.

Also submarines could not be larger than 2,000 tons or have any gun armament of greater than 5.1 inches, light cruisers were restricted to 8,000 tons and 6.1-inch (155 mm) or smaller guns and aircraft carriers were restricted to 23,000 tons. Article 25 however gave the right to depart limitations if any other country authorised, constructed or acquired a capital ship, an aircraft carrier, or a submarine exceeding treaty limits, and if such a departure would be necessary for national security. For this reason, in 1938 the treaty parties agreed on a new displacement limit of 45,000 tons for battleships, the ill-fated battlecruiser already having fallen out of favor.

This London Naval Treaty effectively ended on 1 September 1939 with the beginning of World War II. Even during its brief period of supposed effectiveness, three classes of "treaty" battleships were built or laid down under its limitations, the King George V, North Carolina, and South Dakota classes. The designs of the King George V and North Carolina classes were initiated before the escalator clause was invoked, being intended to be armed with, and protected against, 14-inch guns. The United Kingdom declined to invoke the clause, as redesigning the vessels and developing the proposed 15-inch guns would have delayed construction by 18 months, and since these new battleships were badly needed it was considered prudent to build vessels already finalized with 14-inch guns, even if that meant accepting a reduction in firepower compared to adversaries. The United States invoked the escalator clause after the keels were laid for the two members of the North Carolina class, since the class was designed from the onset to be up-gunned from the original 14-inch main battery with minor modification, so they were completed with 16-inch guns since the United States could afford the delay. However, the completed vessel was an unbalanced battleship since its armor scheme was not proof against its up-gunned main armament, so no further ships of the North Carolina were ordered. The four battleships of the South Dakota class were designed with and protected against 16-inch guns, but maintained a 35,000 ton standard displacement, so this necessitated a shorter hull which made for a compact and cramped ship. No longer limited to the Second London Naval Treaty but still constrained by the need to pass through the Panama Canal, design of the Iowa began in 1938 and its orders were placed in 1939; with improved 16-inch guns and greater speed on a displacement of 45,000 tons.

Article 22 of the 1930 Treaty of London relating to submarine warfare declared international law (the so-called "cruiser rules") applied to submarines as well as to surface vessels. Also, unarmed merchant vessels which did not demonstrate "persistent refusal to stop ... or active resistance to visit or search" could not be sunk without the ships' crews and passengers being first delivered to "a place of safety" (for which lifeboats did not qualify, except under particular circumstances). The 1936 treaty confirmed Article 22 of the 1930 treaty remained in force, and "all others Powers [were invited] to express their assent to the rules embodied in this Article". This became known as the London Submarine Protocol, and over thirty-five nations eventually did subscribe to it, including the U.S., Britain, Germany, and Japan. It was this Protocol which was used at the post-war Nuremberg Trial of Karl Dönitz for ordering unrestricted submarine warfare. These regulations did not prohibit arming merchantmen, but according to Dönitz, arming them, or having them report contact with submarines (or raiders), made them de facto naval auxiliaries and removed the protection of the cruiser rules. This made restrictions on submarines effectively moot.

== See also ==
- Washington Naval Treaty, preceding treaty
- London Naval Treaty, preceding treaty
- Anglo-German Naval Agreement
- Anglo-Soviet Naval Agreement
