= H39 =

H-39 may refer to:

- Hotchkiss H39, a French light tank variant developed around 1939
- H-class battleship proposals, a type of battleship proposed by Nazi Germany
