= H-class battleship proposals =

Proposed class of German battleships

- Artist's impression of an H-class battleship, by Richard Allison

Class overview
- Name: H-class battleship
- Builders: Blohm & Voss; Deschimag
- Operators: Kriegsmarine
- Preceded by: Bismarck class
- Planned: 6
- Completed: 0

General characteristics (H-39 design)
- Type: Fast battleship
- Displacement: 53,400 t (52,600 long tons) standard; 56,444 t (55,553 long tons) combat load; 63,596 t (62,592 long tons) full load
- Length: 266 m (872 ft 8 in) waterline; 277.8 m (911 ft 5 in) overall
- Beam: 37 m (121 ft 5 in)
- Draft: 11.2 m (36 ft 9 in) full load
- Installed power: 165,000 shp (123,000 kW)
- Propulsion: 12 × MAN diesel engines; 3 × screw propellers
- Speed: 30 knots (56 km/h; 35 mph)
- Range: 19,200 nautical miles (35,600 km) at 19 knots (35 km/h; 22 mph)
- Complement: 2,600 officers and enlisted men
- Armament: 8 × 40.6 cm (16 in) guns; 12 × 15 cm (5.9 in) guns; 16 × 10.5 cm (4.1 in) guns; 16 × 3.7 cm (1.5 in) guns; 12 × 2 cm (0.79 in) guns; 6 × 53.3 cm (21 in) torpedo tubes
- Armor: Main belt: 300 mm (11.8 in); Upper belt: 145 mm (5.7 in); Bulkheads: 220 mm (8.7 in); Barbettes: 365 mm (14.4 in); Turret face: 385 mm (15.2 in); Conning tower: 350 mm (13.8 in); Decks: 50–80 mm (2.0–3.1 in), 100–120 mm (3.9–4.7 in)
- Aircraft carried: 4–9 Arado 196 seaplanes
- Aviation facilities: 1 catapult

The H class was a series of battleship designs for Nazi Germany's Kriegsmarine, which were intended to fulfill the requirements of Plan Z in the late 1930s and early 1940s. The first variation, "H-39", called for six ships to be built, essentially as enlarged Bismarck-class battleships with 40.6 cm (16 in) guns and diesel propulsion. The "H-41" design improved the "H-39" ship with still larger main guns, eight 42 cm (16.5 in) weapons, and reinforced deck armor. The Construction Office of the Oberkommando der Marine (OKM) concluded their work with the "H-41" design, and were not involved in subsequent plans. Two of them, "H-42" and "H-43", increased the main battery yet again, with 48 cm (18.9 in) pieces, and the enormous "H-44" design ultimately resulted with 50.8 cm (20 in) guns. The ships ranged in size from the "H-39", which was 277.8 m (911 ft 5 in) long on a displacement of 56,444 t (55,553 long tons), to the "H-44", at 345 m (1,131 ft 11 in) on a displacement of 131,000 t (129,000 long tons). Most of the designs had a proposed top speed in excess of 30 knots (56 km/h).

Due to the outbreak of World War II in September 1939, none of the ships were ever completed; only the first two of the "H-39" ships were laid down. What work that had been accomplished was halted; the assembled steel remained on the slipway until November 1941, when the OKM ordered it be sent for scrap and used for other purposes. Contracts for the other four "H-39" type ships had been awarded, but no work was begun on any of them before they were canceled. None of the subsequent designs progressed further than planning stages.

== Initial design ==
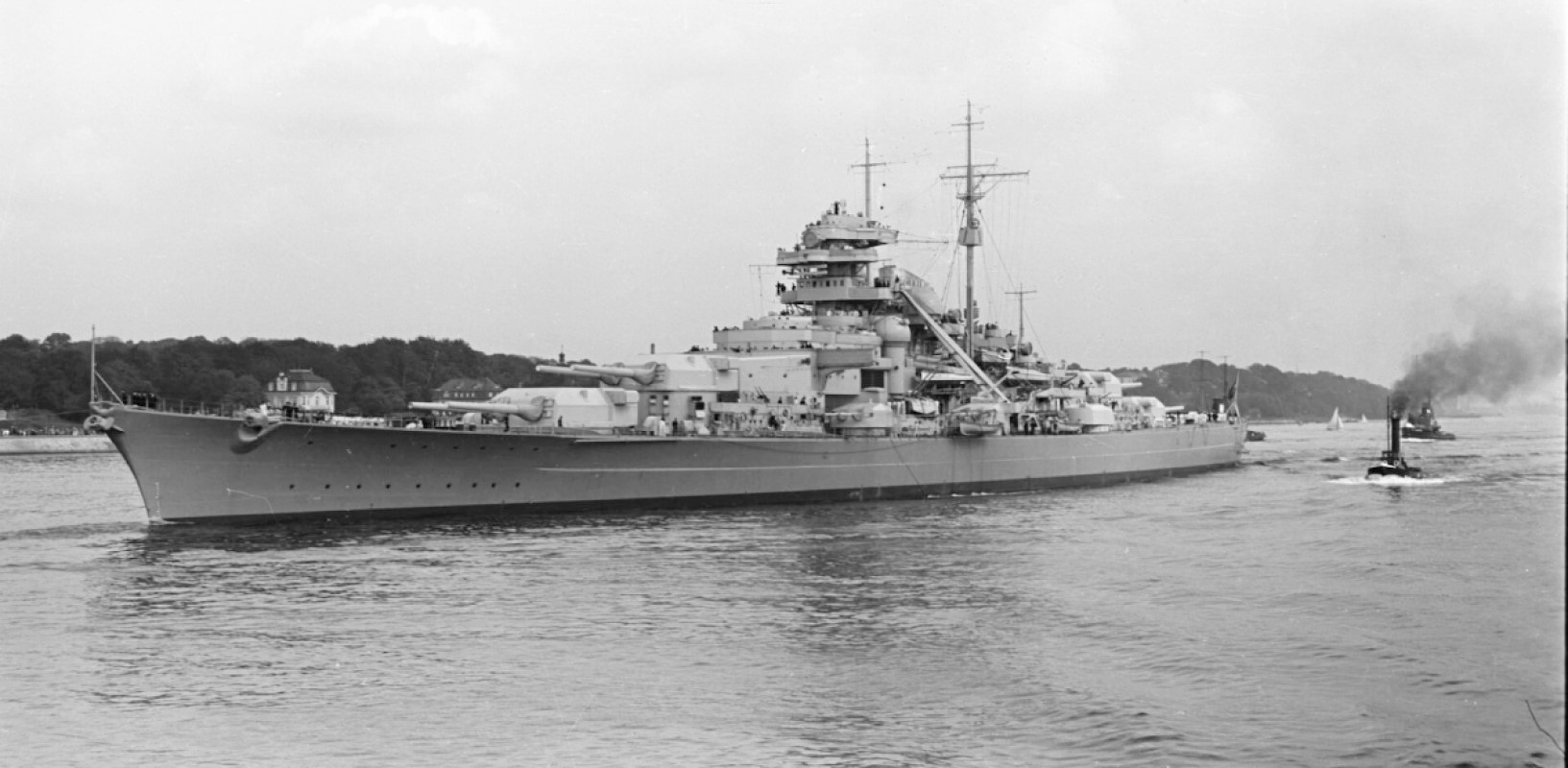
Bismarck, which provided the starting point for design work on the H class

The earliest design studies for "Schlachtschiff H" ("Battleship H") date to 1935, and were near repeats of the early designs for the Bismarck-class ships, armed with 35-centimeter (14 in) guns. Intelligence indicating that the Soviet Navy was planning the Sovetsky Soyuz class with 38 cm (15 in) guns prompted the Germans to increase the caliber of the ship's armament to 38 cm as well on 5 October 1936. (Note: The Sovetsky Soyuz class was actually to be armed with 40.6 cm (16 in) guns.) The Oberkommando der Marine (OKM) issued staff requirements at the end of October for a ship of 35,000 long tons (36,000 t) armed with eight 38 cm guns with a speed of 30 knots (56 km/h; 35 mph). The ship's radius of action was to be at least equal that of the Deutschland-class cruisers.

Design work on the ship that came to be designated H-39 began in 1937. The design staff was instructed to improve upon the design for the preceding Bismarck class; one of the requirements was a larger-caliber main battery to match any battleship built by a potential adversary. After Japan refused to ratify the Second London Naval Treaty in April 1936, an escalator clause went into effect that permitted signatories to arm battleships with guns of up to 40.6 cm (16 in) caliber, something the United States Navy announced it would do with its planned North Carolina-class battleships. By virtue of the Anglo-German Naval Agreement, signed in 1935, Germany was considered to be a party to the other international naval arms limitation treaties.

Admiral Werner Fuchs, responsible for the staff section in the OKM that determined the operating requirements for the ship, discussed the vessel's design with Adolf Hitler, the leader of Germany. Hitler demanded guns larger than any possible adversary, but guns of the caliber demanded by Hitler would have required displacements of over 80,000 long tons (81,000 t) and drafts so deep that it prevented the use of Germany's ports without significant dredging. Fuchs eventually convinced Hitler that the 40.6 cm gun was the optimal choice for the H-39 design. In 1938, the OKM developed Plan Z, the projected construction program for the German navy. A force of six H-39 class battleships was the centerpiece of the fleet. Plan Z was finalized by January 1939, when Admiral Erich Raeder, the commander of the Kriegsmarine, presented it to Hitler. He approved the plan on 18 January and granted the Kriegsmarine unlimited power to bring the construction program to fruition.

Only four shipyards in Germany had slipways large enough to build the six new battleships. The OKM issued orders for construction of the first two ships, "H" and "J", on 14 April 1939. The contracts for the other four ships, "K", "L", "M", and "N", followed on 25 May. The keels for the first two ships were laid at the Blohm & Voss dockyard in Hamburg and the Deschimag shipyard in Bremen on 15 July and 1 September 1939, respectively. The outbreak of war in September 1939 interrupted the construction of the ships. Work on the first two was suspended and the other four were not laid down, as it was believed they would not be finished before the war was over. The keel for "H" had 800 t (790 long tons; 880 short tons) of steel installed, 3,500 t (3,400 long tons; 3,900 short tons) of steel had been machined, out of 5,800 t (5,700 long tons; 6,400 short tons) of steel supplied to Blohm & Voss by that point. Only 40 t (39 long tons; 44 short tons) of steel had been worked into the keel for "J", out of 3,531 t (3,475 long tons; 3,892 short tons) of steel delivered. Steel for the other four ships had been ordered and partially machined for installation, though no assembly work had begun. It was expected to resume work on the ships after a German victory in the war.

The ships neither received names nor were official name proposals published. The names, which appear in several publications (Hindenburg, Friedrich der Große, Großdeutschland) are pure speculation. Especially the often mentioned Großdeutschland (Greater Germany) is highly unlikely, as Hitler always feared the loss of a vessel with the name of Germany (this showed with the renaming of Deutschland to Lützow). The only hint on the names of the units were given by Hitler himself, who mentioned during documented unofficial talks, that he would propose the names Ulrich von Hutten and Götz von Berlichingen for the ships, as these names are not connected with persons of the Third Reich or the country itself, so the loss would not have a significant negative psychological and propaganda effect on the German people.

=== H-39 specifications ===
==== Characteristics and machinery ====
As finalized, the H-39 design called for a ship 266 m (872 ft 8 in) long at the waterline and 277.8 m (911 ft 5 in) long overall. The beam was to have been 37 m (121 ft 5 in) with a designed draft of 10 m (32 ft 10 in) at 55,553 long tons (56,444 t) displacement. At standard displacement, which was 52,600 long tons (53,400 t), the draft was slightly under the design value, at 9.6 m (31 ft 6 in). With the ship fully loaded, at 62,600 long tons (63,600 t), draft rose significantly, to 11.2 m (36 ft 9 in). The hull was constructed from transverse and longitudinal steel frames and featured over 90 percent welding. The hull contained twenty-one large watertight compartments and a double bottom that extended for 89 percent of the length of the keel. Four bilge keels were fitted to improve stability. The ships had an estimated complement of 2,600 officers and enlisted men.

The ships were to be powered by twelve MAN 9-cylinder double acting 2-stroke diesel engines. The engines were arranged in groups of four, on three shafts, and drove three-bladed screws 4.8 m (15 ft 9 in) in diameter. Four auxiliary boilers were installed to provide backup power; two were oil-fired and were located between the central transmission rooms. The other two, a pair of exhaust gas boilers, were placed above them. The power-plant was rated at 165,000 shaft horsepower (123,000 kW) and 256 rpm; it provided a top speed of 30 knots (56 km/h; 35 mph) as designed. The vessels could have carried up to 8,700 t (8,600 long tons; 9,600 short tons) of diesel oil, which enabled a range of 7,000 nautical miles (13,000 km; 8,100 mi) at 28 kn (52 km/h; 32 mph), or 19,200 nmi (35,600 km; 22,100 mi) at a cruising speed of 19 kn (35 km/h; 22 mph). The design had one main rudder along the keel behind the center shaft and two smaller wing rudders. Electrical power was to be provided by eight 920 kW DC diesel generators at 230 volts and four 460 kW AC diesel generators at 110 volts for a total of 9,200 kW.

==== Armament ====
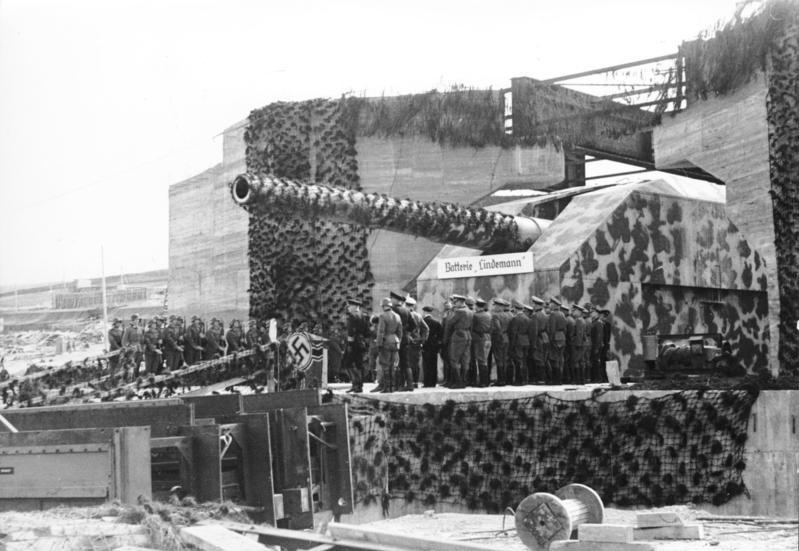
One of the 40.6 cm guns at Batterie Lindemann', part of the Atlantic Wall

The main armament was to consist of eight 40.6 cm SK C/34 guns in four twin gun turrets. The 40.6 cm (16.0 in) gun was 52 calibers long and fired at a muzzle velocity of 810 meters per second (2,657 ft/s). The guns were supplied with a total of 960 rounds of ammunition or 120 shells per gun; each shell weighed 1,030 kg (2,270 lb). The guns used a sliding breech block, as was typical for German naval guns of the period; the breech was fully sealed with a 91 kg (201 lb) brass cartridge that contained the 128 kg (282 lb) main propellant charge. A bagged fore charge weighing 134 kg (295 lb) supplemented the main charge. The turrets allowed for elevation to 30 degrees, which provided a maximum range of approximately 36,400 m (39,800 yd). (Note: These figures are according to John Campbell; Erich Gröner states a range of 36,800 m (40,200 yd) at 30 degrees of elevation, while William Garzke and Robert Dulin specify a range of 37,800 m (41,300 yd) at 33 degrees.) Rate of fire was expected to be two rounds per minute per gun. Fire control radar was unspecified, but the ships, which were to have been completed by 1944, presumably would have been equipped with an arrangement similar to that of Tirpitz as she was outfitted in 1943–44. Several of the 40.6 cm guns were constructed before work on the ships was halted; these were later employed as coastal guns, including at Battery Lindemann near Sangatte in France. (Note: Battery Lindemann was named in honor of the late Kapitän zur See Ernst Lindemann, the commander of battleship Bismarck.)

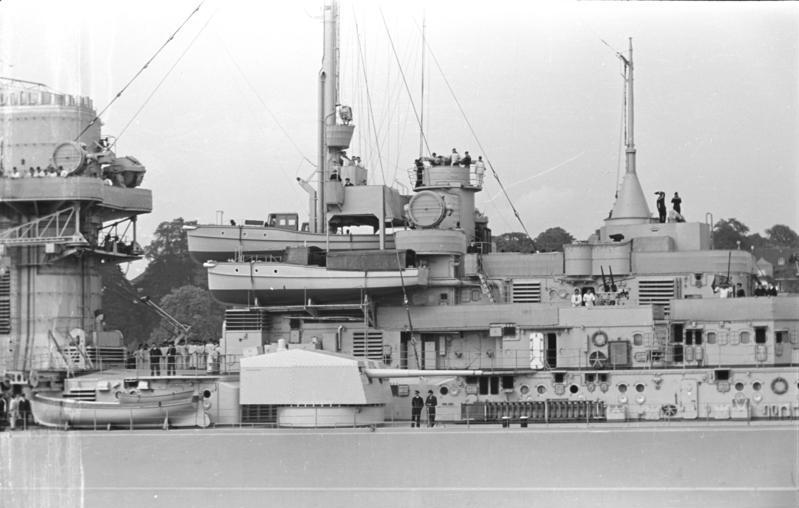
One of the 15 cm turrets on Bismarck, the same type as would have been mounted on the H class.

Twelve 15 cm (5.9 in) L/55 C28 guns mounted in six twin turrets comprised the ships' secondary battery. These were the same secondaries employed on the Scharnhorst and Bismarck classes. The turrets allowed 40 degrees of elevation and had a maximum range of 23,000 m (25,000 yd). They fired a 45.3 kg (100 lb) shell at a muzzle velocity of 875 m/s (2,870 ft/s) and were primarily intended for defense against surface threats. The ships were also to be armed with six 53.3 cm (21 in) torpedo tubes, all submerged. They were all mounted in the bow, diverging from the centerline by 10 degrees.

Sixteen dual-mounted 10.5 cm (4.1 in) L/65 C33 Flak guns provided long-range defense against aircraft. Unlike those mounted on the Scharnhorst and Bismarck classes, these guns were armored to protect their crews from shrapnel, debris, and strafing attacks. The new turrets also provided faster rates of training and elevation as compared to the earlier open mounts. Close-range air defense was provided by a battery of sixteen 3.7 cm (1.5 in) L/83 C33 and either twelve, or twenty-four 2 cm (0.79 in) C38 guns according to Gröner and Garzke & Dulin, respectively. The 3.7 cm guns were placed in eight twin mounts while the 2 cm guns were arrayed in six Flakvierling quadruple mountings. The 3.7 cm guns were closely grouped amidships and had a single, common ammunition hoist. Historians William Dulin and Robert Garzke note that the anti-aircraft battery as designed was too weak to effectively defend against the high-performance aircraft that came into service in the late 1930s and 1940s, and speculate that "it would have been augmented before the ships were completed."

==== Armor ====
The design team envisioned the H-class ships fighting at relatively close range, and therefore selected the armor system that had been used by German battleship constructors since the Nassau class of 1907. The side belt was vertical and was attached directly to the side of the hull, in contrast with the inclined armor belt placed inboard of the side wall used by American and French designers. The side belt, which consisted of Krupp cemented steel armor (KCA), was 300 mm (11.8 in) thick in the central section that covered the ammunition magazines and machinery spaces. The belt was reduced to 220 mm (8.7 in) on either end of the main section; the stern and bow were unprotected by the main belt. The upper side belt was 145 mm (5.7 in) thick. The German navy did not preserve official estimates for the immunity zone, though Garzke and Dulin created an estimate based on the performance of the US 16 in (40.6 cm)/45 caliber gun firing a 1,016 kg (2,240 lb) shell. The ships' main armor would have rendered them proof against the 16 in shell at ranges between 11,000 to 21,000 m (12,000 to 23,000 yd). The 16 in shell could penetrate the upper side belt at any range, however, which left the ships exposed above the waterline.

The underwater protection system was broadly similar to the system employed on the Bismarck class. A 45 mm (1.8 in) thick torpedo bulkhead composed of Wotan Weich steel backed the side armor and provided defense against underwater weapons. (Note: "Wotan Weich"—"Wotan soft"—was a type of steel armor developed by the German navy. It had a breaking strength of 65–75 square millimeters and expanded up to 25 percent. "Wotan Hart"—"Wotan Hard"—was more rigid and had a breaking strength of 85–96 mm^{2} and expanded up to 20 percent.) The bulkhead was placed 5.5 m (18 ft) from the side of the hull, though abreast of the turrets and further in the bow and stern, this distance could not be maintained. The distance between the bulkhead and the side of the ship was reduced to 3.25 m (10.7 ft) in these areas; the designers compensated for the reduced space by increasing the thickness of the bulkhead to 60 mm (2.4 in) in these areas.

Two armored decks composed of Wotan Hart steel protected the ships from plunging fire and aerial weapons. The upper deck was 80 mm (3.1 in) thick above the magazines and 50 mm (2 in) over the machinery spaces. The main armored deck was 120 and 100 mm (4.7 and 3.9 in) thick, respectively, though on the outboard sloped sections, thickness was increased to augment the protection over the ships' vitals. Over the magazines, the sloped armor was 150 mm (5.9 in) thick; over the machinery spaces it was 120 mm thick. Concerned with the fate of the battlecruiser Lützow at the Battle of Jutland, (Note: Lützow was lost during the battle due to uncontrollable flooding caused by heavy damage to her unarmored bow.) the designers opted to provide relatively heavy bow armor for the H-class ships. A 60 to 150 mm (2.4 to 5.9 in) thick splinter belt protected the bow from shell fragments. It was reasoned that direct shell hits would cause localized damage that could be better isolated than damage from splinters, which could cause extensive flooding.

The main battery gun turrets were armored with 385 mm (15.2 in) thick faces, 240 mm (9.4 in) thick sides, and 130 mm (5.1 in) roofs. The rear side of the turret was 325 mm (12.8 in) thick; in addition to the protection offered by the greater thickness, it also moved the center of gravity of the mounting to the rear, which helped balance the turret and improve its operation. The barbettes upon which the turrets sat were armored with 365 mm (14.4 in) face-hardened steel above the upper armor deck and 240 mm (9.4 in) non-cemented steel below the deck. The 15 cm gun turrets had 100 mm (3.9 in) thick faces, 40 mm (1.6 in) thick sides, and 35 mm (1.4 in) thick roofs. Their barbettes had 80 mm (3.1 in) thick armor protection. The 10.5 cm mounts were protected by 20 mm (0.79 in) thick gun shields. The forward conning tower had 350 mm (13.8 in) thick sides composed of KCA and 200 mm (7.9 in) thick roof composed of non-cemented steel. The rear conning tower had 100 mm thick sides and roof, KCA and non-cemented steel, respectively.

== Design escalation ==
In early July 1940, Hitler ordered the navy to examine new battleship designs and how wartime experience might be incorporated. A study was completed on 15 July, and contained several recommendations for the H-class ships, including increasing the freeboard and strengthening the horizontal protection. In order to maintain displacement and speed and accommodate the increased weight of the additional armor protection, the design staff drew up an informal design, known as "Scheme A." The design removed one of the main battery turrets to save weight; the propulsion system was also increased in power to keep the same speed as the original design. The original diesel-only system was replaced by a hybrid diesel and steam turbine arrangement. The staff also prepared a second design, "Scheme B", which retained the fourth turret and accepted a much higher displacement. This design also incorporated the mixed propulsion system. These studies were abandoned in 1941 after Hitler decided to halt further battleship construction until after the end of the war. The design staff therefore attempted to improve the armor protection for the H-class. The 1940 designs did not form part of the design chain that resulted in the H-41 through H-44 designs.

=== H-41 ===
General characteristics (H-41 design)
- Displacement: 64,000 t (63,000 long tons) standard; 68,800 t (67,700 long tons) combat load; 76,000 t (74,800 long tons) full load
- Length: 275 m (902 ft 3 in) waterline; 282 m (925 ft 2 in) overall
- Beam: 39 m (127 ft 11 in)
- Draft: 12.15 m (39 ft 10 in) full load
- Installed power: 165,000 shp (123,000 kW)
- Propulsion: 12 × MAN diesel engines; 3 × shafts
- Speed: 28.8 knots (53.3 km/h)
- Range: 20,000 nautical miles (37,000 km) at 19 knots (35 km/h)
- Armament: 8 × 42 cm (16.5 in) guns; 34 × 2 cm (0.8 in) guns; (all other armament same as H-39)
- Armor: Upper belt: 200 mm (7.9 in); Decks: 50–80 mm (2.0–3.1 in), 150–200 mm (5.9–7.9 in); (all other armor thicknesses same as H-39)
- Notes: Characteristics listed are prior to design changes approved on 15 November 1941

Bomb damage sustained by Scharnhorst in July 1941 provided the impetus for the effort to increase the horizontal protection for the H-class. (Note: Scharnhorst was attacked by British bombers while stationed in La Pallice; she was hit by five bombs, all of which penetrated the ship's armored decks.) The designers were confronted with a significant problem: any increase in armor could correspondingly increase the displacement and more importantly, the draft. It was necessary to maintain the full-load draft of 11.5 m of the H-39 design for operations in the relatively shallow North Sea. The only option that allowed the displacement to be maintained while armor thicknesses to be increased was to reduce the ships' fuel supplies. A 25 percent cut in range was required, which was deemed unacceptable by the OKM. It was eventually determined that since deep-water anchorages on the Atlantic coast were available, it would be permissible to allow the draft to increase. The initial redesign called for an increase of only 5,000 long tons (5,100 t), 40 percent of which was additional deck armor, the remainder being used for a larger-caliber main battery.

One of the most significant changes was the decision to bore out the over-sized 40.6 cm guns to 42 cm caliber for the H-41 design. The design staff determined that modifications to the ammunition hoists and loading equipment would be easily effected and that the original turrets could be retained. The OKM was aware that the British had settled on a 40.6 cm gun for the proposed Lion class; the 42 cm gun would grant the H-41 design a significant advantage over these new adversaries. The ships' armament was otherwise unchanged, apart from an increased number of 2 cm anti-aircraft guns, of which there were now to be 34.

The ships' main armor decks were substantially strengthened: the deck was increased in thickness from 120 to 200 mm (4.7 to 7.9 in) and the sloped armor at the edges was thickened from 150 to 175 mm (5.9 to 6.9 in). Wartime experience with the Scharnhorst class indicated that the torpedo-defense system was insufficiently strong to protect the H-39 design from underwater damage. Beam was therefore increased, with greater width added at the ends of the armored citadel to allow a greater distance between the side wall and the torpedo bulkhead. The stern section of the torpedo bulkhead was also strengthened structurally to allow it to better contain the force of an underwater explosion. The number of large watertight compartments was increased from twenty-one to twenty-two. A triple bottom was also included in the design, the first time this feature was used in a German warship design. The loss of Bismarck in May 1941 also influenced the design; two large skegs were added to the outboard shafts to protect them and increase support for the stern while in drydock. The rudder system was also designed with an explosive charge to detach the rudders in the event they became jammed.

The new design measured 275 m (902 ft 3 in) long at the waterline and 282 m (925 ft 2 in) long overall, had a beam of 39 m (127 ft 11 in), and a draft of up to 12.2 m (40 ft 0 in) at full load displacement of about 74,800 long tons (76,000 t). The increase in weight, while engine power remained constant, reduced speed to 28.8 kn (53.3 km/h; 33.1 mph). However, German naval constructors were not satisfied with the torpedo side-protection system, and a series of design changes were approved by Admiral Raeder on 15 November 1941; these included increasing the side-protection system depth from 5.5 to 6.65 m (18 ft 1 in to 21 ft 10 in), increasing beam to 40.5 m (132 ft 10 in), and greater hull depth and freeboard at full load. These changes resulted in full load displacement increasing to 77,752 long tons (79,000 t) and maximum speed further decreasing to 28 kn (52 km/h; 32 mph).

As detailed design continued into 1942, the OKM planned to begin construction six to nine months after demobilization, initially at Blohm & Voss and the Deutsche Werke shipyard in Kiel. Deschimag, which had been awarded the contract for "J", could no longer be used due to the increase in draft, which precluded travel through the shallow Weser. Following the completion of a new, larger dock at the Kriegsmarinewerft in Wilhelmshaven, work would also be done there. The increased size of the ships would have lengthened the building time from four to five years.

=== H-42 through H-44 ===
On 8 February 1942, Albert Speer became the Reichsminister for Armaments and Munitions and gained influence over the Navy's construction programs. Speer reassigned some members of the H class design staff to work on new U-boats and other tasks deemed critical to the war effort. The Schiffsneubaukommission (New Ships Construction Commission), intended to liaise with Speer and the OKM, was created and placed under the direction of Admiral Karl Topp. This group was responsible for the design work that resulted in the H-42 type, as well as the subsequent designs. The Construction Office of the OKM formally concluded their work on new battleships with the H-41 type in August 1942 and played no further role in battleship development.

After the completion of the H-41 design, Hitler issued a request for a larger battleship and placed no restrictions on gun caliber or displacement. The only requirements were a speed of 30 kn (56 km/h; 35 mph), horizontal and underwater protection strong enough to protect the vessel from all attacks, and a main battery properly balanced with the size of the ship. The results were purely study projects intended to determine the size of a ship with strong enough armor to counter the rapidly increasing power of bombs deployed by the Allies during the war. The Commission did not discuss its activities with Raeder or his successor, Admiral Karl Dönitz, or with other branches in the OKM. As the designs for the H-42, H-43, and H-44 battleships were purely conjectural, no actual work was begun. The German navy did not seriously consider construction on any of the designs, which were so large that they could not have been built in a traditional slipway. The Construction Office of the OKM sought to disassociate itself from the projects, which they found to be of doubtful merit and unnecessary for German victory.

The first design, H-42, was 305 m (1,000 ft 8 in) long between perpendiculars and had a beam of 42.8 m (140 ft 5 in) and a draft of 11.8 m (38 ft 9 in) designed and 12.7 m (41 ft 8 in) at full load. The designed displacement was 90,000 t (89,000 long tons; 99,000 short tons) and at full load rose to 96,555 long tons (98,104 t). The dimensions for the second, H-43, increased to 330 m (1,082 ft 8 in) between perpendiculars, a beam of 48 m (157 ft 6 in), and design and full load drafts of 12 and 12.9 m (39 ft 4 in and 42 ft 4 in), respectively. Design displacement was 111,000 t (109,000 long tons; 122,000 short tons) and estimated at 118,110 long tons (120,010 t) at full load. For the final design, H-44, the length rose to 345 m (1,131 ft 11 in) between perpendiculars, the beam increased to 51.5 m (169 ft 0 in), and draft rose to 12.7 m (41 ft 8 in) as designed and 13.5 m (44 ft 3 in) at full load. The displacement for H-44 was 131,000 t (129,000 long tons; 144,000 short tons) as designed and up to 139,272 long tons (141,507 t) at full load.

Details on the propulsion systems for these designs are fragmentary and in some cases contradictory. Erich Gröner notes that "some [had] pure [diesel] engine propulsion, others [had] hybrid engine/turbine propulsion systems," but does not record the type and performance for these propulsion systems. William Garzke and Robert Dulin state that all three designs featured hybrid diesel/steam turbine plants, each supplying 266,000 shp (198,000 kW) for top speeds of 31.9 kn (59.1 km/h; 36.7 mph), 30.9 kn (57.2 km/h; 35.6 mph), and 29.8 kn (55.2 km/h; 34.3 mph) for H-42, H-43, and H-44, respectively. According to Garzke and Dulin, the designs had a speed of 24 kn (44 km/h; 28 mph), 23 kn (43 km/h; 26 mph), and 22.5 kn (41.7 km/h; 25.9 mph), respectively, on just diesel engine power. Both sources agree on a maximum range of 20,000 nmi (37,000 km; 23,000 mi) at a cruising speed of 19 kn (35 km/h; 22 mph).

Information on the armament outfits for the designs is equally contradictory. Both sources agree on the armament for H-44, which was to have been eight 50.8 cm (20.0 in) guns. Gröner indicates that H-42 and H-43 were to be armed with eight 48 cm guns, while Garzke and Dulin state that the H-42 design was to have retained the 42 cm guns from the H-41 design and H-43 would have also been armed with 50.8 cm pieces. Both works agree that the secondary armament was to have consisted of twelve 15 cm L/55 guns and sixteen 10.5 cm L/65 guns as in the previous designs, though the lighter weapons are disputed. Gröner states that all three designs were to be equipped with twenty-eight 3.7 cm and forty 2 cm anti-aircraft guns, while Garzke and Dulin report only sixteen 3.7 cm guns and forty 2 cm guns for H-43 and H-44 only; H-42 was to have twenty-four 2 cm guns. Both sources concur that six submerged 53.3 cm torpedo tubes were included in each design.

== Designs ==
According to Gröner
| Design | H-39 | H-41 | H-42 | H-43 | H-44 |
|---|---|---|---|---|---|
| Displacement | 56,444 t (55,553 long tons) | 68,800 t (67,700 long tons) | 90,000 t (89,000 long tons) | 111,000 t (109,000 long tons) | 131,000 t (129,000 long tons) |
| Length | 277.8 m (911 ft 5 in) | 282 m (925 ft 2 in) | 305 m (1,000 ft 8 in) | 330 m (1,082 ft 8 in) | 345 m (1,131 ft 11 in) |
| Beam | 37 m (121 ft 5 in) | 39 m (127 ft 11 in) | 42.8 m (140 ft 5 in) | 48 m (157 ft 6 in) | 51.5 m (169 ft) |
| Draft | 10 m (32 ft 10 in) | 11.1 m (36 ft 5 in) | 11.8 m (38 ft 9 in) | 12 m (39 ft 4 in) | 12.7 m (41 ft 8 in) |
| Main | 8 × 40.6 cm (16 in) | 8 × 42 cm (16.5 in) | 8 × 48 cm (18.9 in) | | 8 × 50.8 cm (20 in) |
| Secondary | 12 × 15 cm (5.9 in) and 16 × 10.5 cm (4.1 in) | | | | |
| AA | 16 × 3.7 cm (1.5 in) and 12 × 2 cm (0.79 in) | 32 × 3.7 cm (1.5 in) and 12 × 2 cm (0.79 in) | 28 × 3.7 cm (1.5 in) and 40 × 2 cm (0.79 in) | | |
| Torpedoes | 6 × 53.3 cm (21 in) | | | | |
