= Zone of immunity =

Warship design concept

The zone of immunity (or immunity zone) around a warship is an area from which both plunging fire and direct enemy fire is less effective. The concept was a factor in battleship design and in tactics during engagements.

== Background ==
Warships traditionally have vertical, or near vertical, belt armour which protects against missiles (shells) travelling horizontally, and horizontal deck armour, which protects against plunging (downward) shell fire. Belt armour is generally thicker than deck armour.

A shell fired at short range will travel at a high velocity on a more or less horizontal trajectory. If it strikes a ship it will do so either at an acute angle to the belt armour or an oblique angle to the deck armour.

A shell fired at long range will travel on a ballistic trajectory, arriving at its target at a steep angle of descent and so strike the deck armour although at a velocity markedly less than its original muzzle velocity.

If a ship is too close to an adversary, shells fired horizontally may pierce inadequate vertical armour; beyond a certain range, determined by the kinetic energy of incoming projectiles, plunging shells will penetrate deck armour. The distance between these two situations, which is determined by the energy of incoming ordnance and the thickness of the armour of the target vessel, is known as the zone of immunity.

== See also ==
- Sloped armour

== Sources ==
- Friedman, Norman (1985). U.S. Battleships: An Illustrated Design History. Naval Institute Press. ISBN 0-87021-715-1.
