= Battleship =

Large armored warship with a main battery consisting of heavy caliber guns

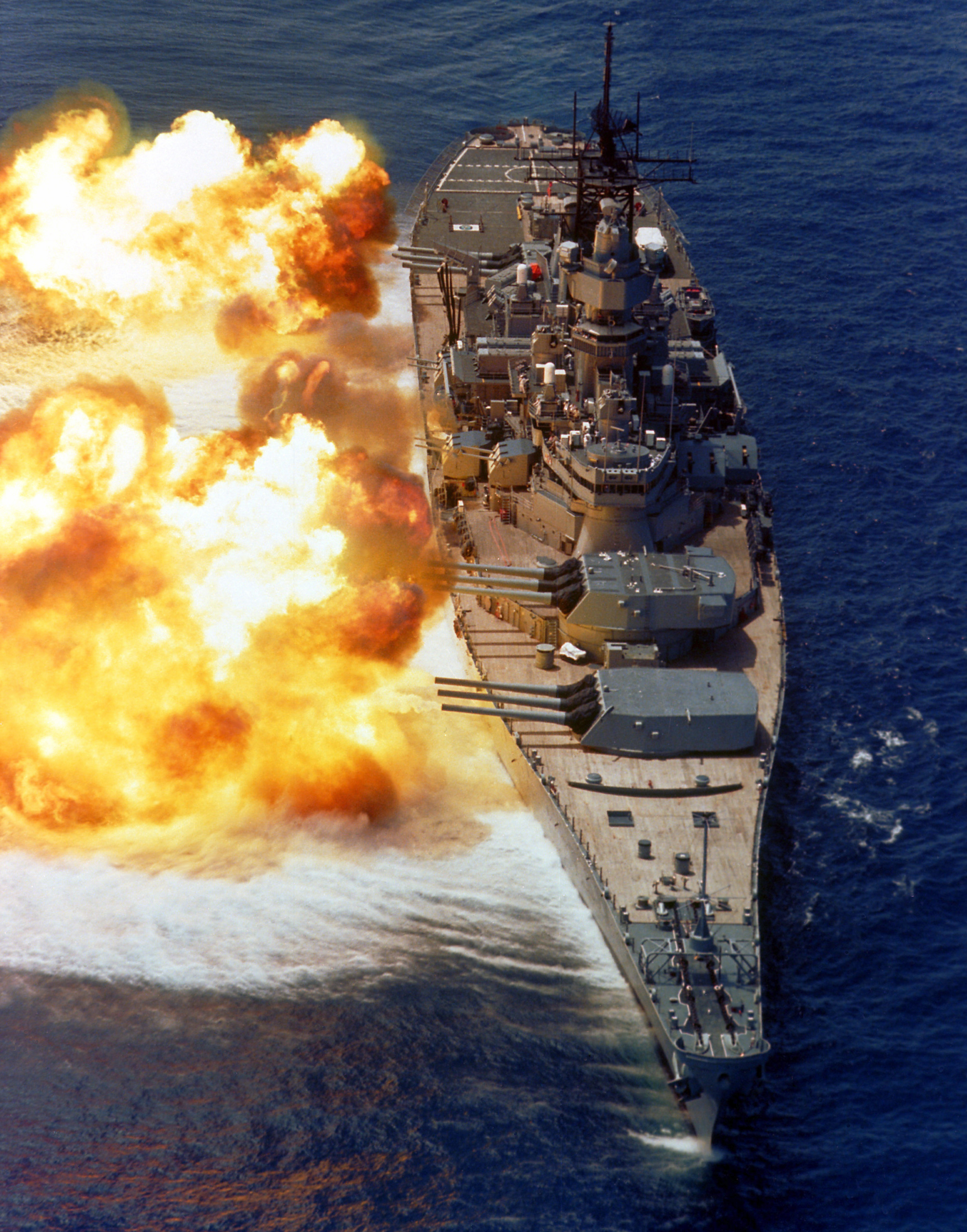
USS Iowa firing a broadside

A battleship was a heavily armored large warship with a main battery consisting of large guns, designed to serve as a capital ship. From their advent in the late 1880s, battleships were among the largest and most formidable warship types ever built, until they were surpassed by aircraft carriers beginning in the 1940s. The modern battleship traces its origin to the sailing ship of the line, which was developed into the steam ship of the line and soon thereafter the ironclad warship. After a period of extensive experimentation in the 1870s and 1880s, ironclad design was largely standardized by the British Royal Sovereign class, which are usually referred to as the first "pre-dreadnought battleships". These ships carried an armament that usually included four large guns and several medium-caliber guns that were to be used against enemy battleships, and numerous small guns for self defense.

Naval powers around the world built dozens of pre-dreadnoughts in the 1890s and early 1900s, though they saw relatively little combat; only two major wars were fought during the period that included pre-dreadnought battles: the Spanish–American War in 1898 and the Russo-Japanese War of 1904–1905. The following year, the British launched the revolutionary all-big-gun battleship HMS Dreadnought. This ship discarded the medium-caliber guns in exchange for a uniform armament of ten large guns. All other major navies quickly began (or had already started) "dreadnoughts" of their own, leading to a major naval arms race. During World War I, only one major fleet engagement took place: the Battle of Jutland in 1916, but neither side was able to achieve a decisive result.

In the interwar period, the major naval powers concluded a series of agreements beginning with the Washington Naval Treaty that imposed limits on battleship building to stop a renewed arms race. During this period, relatively few battleships were built, but advances in technology led to the maturation of the fast battleship concept, and several of these ships were built in the 1930s. The treaty system eventually broke down after Japan refused to sign the Second London Naval Treaty in 1936. Although the rise of the aircraft carrier during World War II largely relegated battleships to secondary duties, they still saw significant action during that conflict. Notable engagements include the battles of Cape Spartivento and Cape Matapan in 1940 and 1941, respectively; the sortie by the German battleship Bismarck in 1941; the Naval Battle of Guadalcanal in 1942; and the Battle of Leyte Gulf in 1944. After World War II, most battleships were placed in reserve, broken up, or used as target ships, and few saw significant active service during the Cold War. The four American Iowa-class battleships were reactivated during the Korean War in the early 1950s and again in the 1980s as part of the 600-ship Navy.

Even at the height of their dominance of naval combat, some strategists questioned the usefulness of battleships. Beginning in the mid-1880s, the Jeune École (Young School) argued that construction of expensive capital ships should stop in favor of cheap cruisers and torpedo boats. Despite a period of popularity for the Jeune École, the idea fell out of favor, and the battleship remained the arbiter of naval combat until World War II. Even afterward, they remained potent symbols of a country's might and retained significant psychological and diplomatic effects. A number of battleships—predominantly American—remain as museum ships.

== Background ==
=== Ships of the line ===
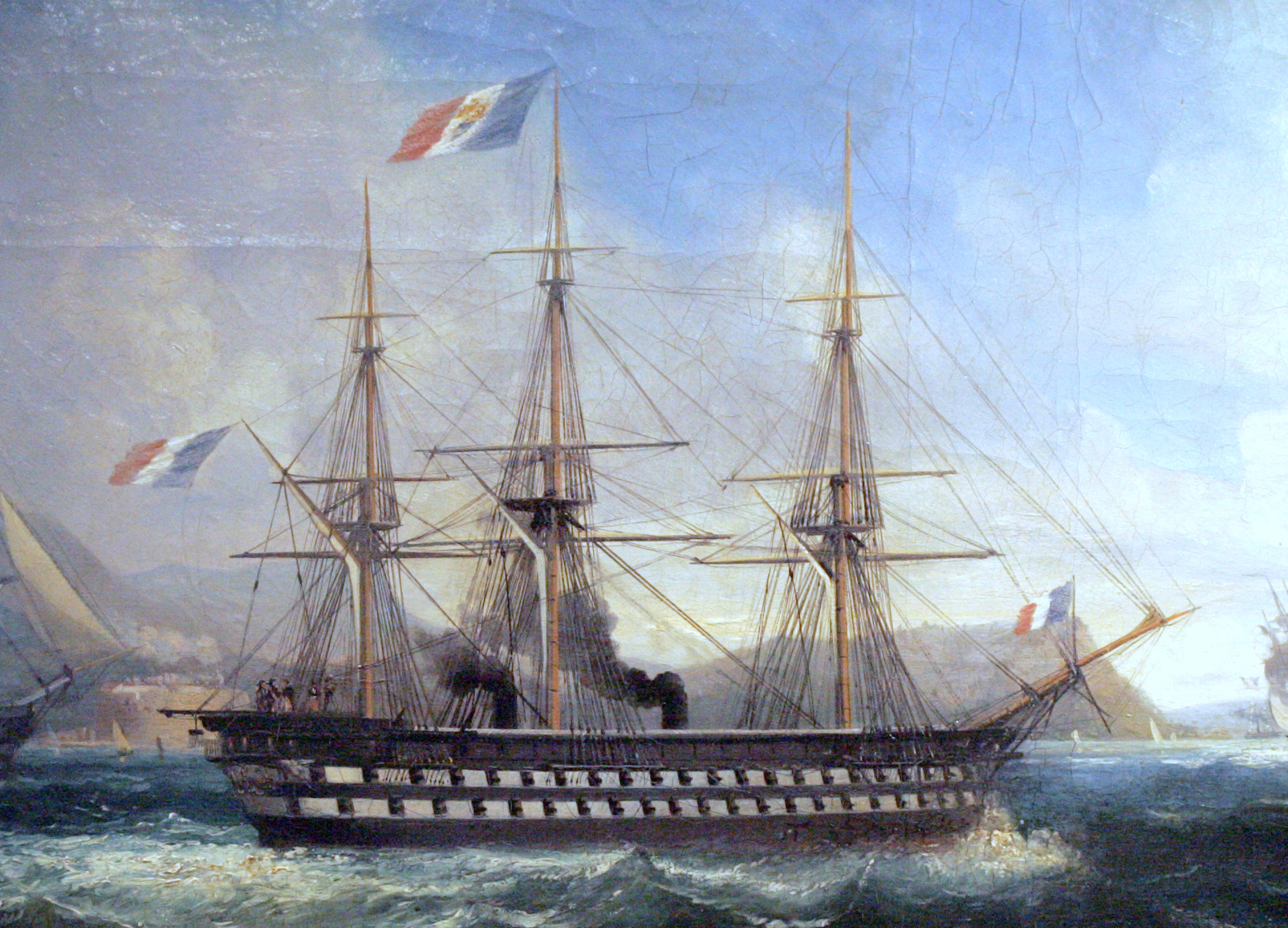
Napoléon (1850), the world's first steam-powered battleship

A ship of the line was a large, unarmored wooden sailing ship which mounted a battery of up to 120 smoothbore guns and carronades, which came to prominence with the adoption of line of battle tactics in the early 17th century. From 1794, the alternative term 'line of battle ship' was contracted to 'battle ship' or 'battleship'. The sheer number of guns fired broadside meant a ship of the line could wreck any wooden enemy, holing her hull, knocking down masts, wrecking her rigging, and killing her crew. They also imparted a psychological effect on the crews of smaller vessels. Ships of the line were also fairly resilient to the guns of the day; for example, the British Royal Navy lost no first-rate (the largest type of ship of the line) to enemy action during the entire 18th century. Over time, ships of the line gradually became larger and carried more guns, but otherwise remained quite similar. Development of the first-rates was particularly conservative, as these ships represented a major investment. By the early 1800s, the traditional "seventy-four" (so-named because it carried 74 guns) was no longer considered to be a proper ship of the line, having been supplanted by 84- and 120-gun ships.

The first major change to the ship of the line concept was the introduction of steam power as an auxiliary propulsion system. Steam power was gradually introduced to the navy in the first half of the 19th century, initially for small craft and later for frigates. Early vessels used paddle wheels for propulsion, but by the 1840s, the first screw propeller-equipped vessels began to appear. The value of these smaller steam-powered warships demonstrated their worth when vessels like the British Nemesis proved to be critical to the Anglo-French success in the First Opium War in the 1840s.

The French Navy introduced steam to the line of battle with the 90-gun Napoléon in 1850—the first true steam battleship. Napoléon, which was designed by Henri Dupuy de Lôme, was armed as a conventional ship-of-the-line, but her steam engines could give her a speed of 12 knots (22 km/h; 14 mph), regardless of the wind. This was a potentially decisive advantage in a naval engagement. The introduction of steam accelerated the growth in size of battleships. France and the United Kingdom were the only countries to develop fleets of wooden, steam-screw battleships, although several other navies operated small numbers of screw battleships, including Russia (9), the Ottoman Empire (3), Sweden (2), Naples (1), Denmark (1) and Austria (1).

Concurrent with the development of steam power, another major technological step heralded the end of the traditional ship of the line: guns capable of firing explosive shells. Pioneering work was done by the French artillery officer Henri-Joseph Paixhans beginning in 1809. The American artillerist George Bomford followed not far behind, designing the first shell-firing Columbiad in 1812. The British and Russians began to follow suit in the 1830s, though early smoothbore guns could not fire shells as far as solid shot, which hampered widespread adoption in any fleet. By the early 1840s, the French Paixhans gun and American Dahlgren gun had begun to be adopted by their respective navies. In the Crimean War of 1853–1855, six Russian ships of the line and two frigates of the Black Sea Fleet destroyed seven Turkish frigates and three corvettes with explosive shells at the Battle of Sinop in 1853. The battle was widely seen as vindication of the shell gun. (Note: The actual effectiveness of the guns has been called into question by modern historians such as Lawrence Sondhaus, who states that "to draw such 'lessons' one had to ignore that it took six hours for Nakhimov to destroy the Turco-Egyptian squadron, despite the fact that he had six ships of the line with over 600 guns and that Osman Pasha's largest warships were frigates. Competent gunnery using solid shot alone would have achieved the same outcome." John Beeler agrees, stating that "the effects of explosive shell, supposedly the death-knell of the wooden warship, have been considerably overrated by most naval historians.") Nevertheless, wooden-hulled ships stood up comparatively well to shells, as shown in the 1866 Battle of Lissa, where the modern Austrian steam ship of the line SMS Kaiser ranged across a confused battlefield, rammed an Italian ironclad and took 80 hits from Italian ironclads, many of which were shells, including at least one 300-pound (140 kg) shot at point-blank range. Despite losing her bowsprit and her foremast, and being set on fire, she was ready for action again the very next day.

=== Ironclads ===
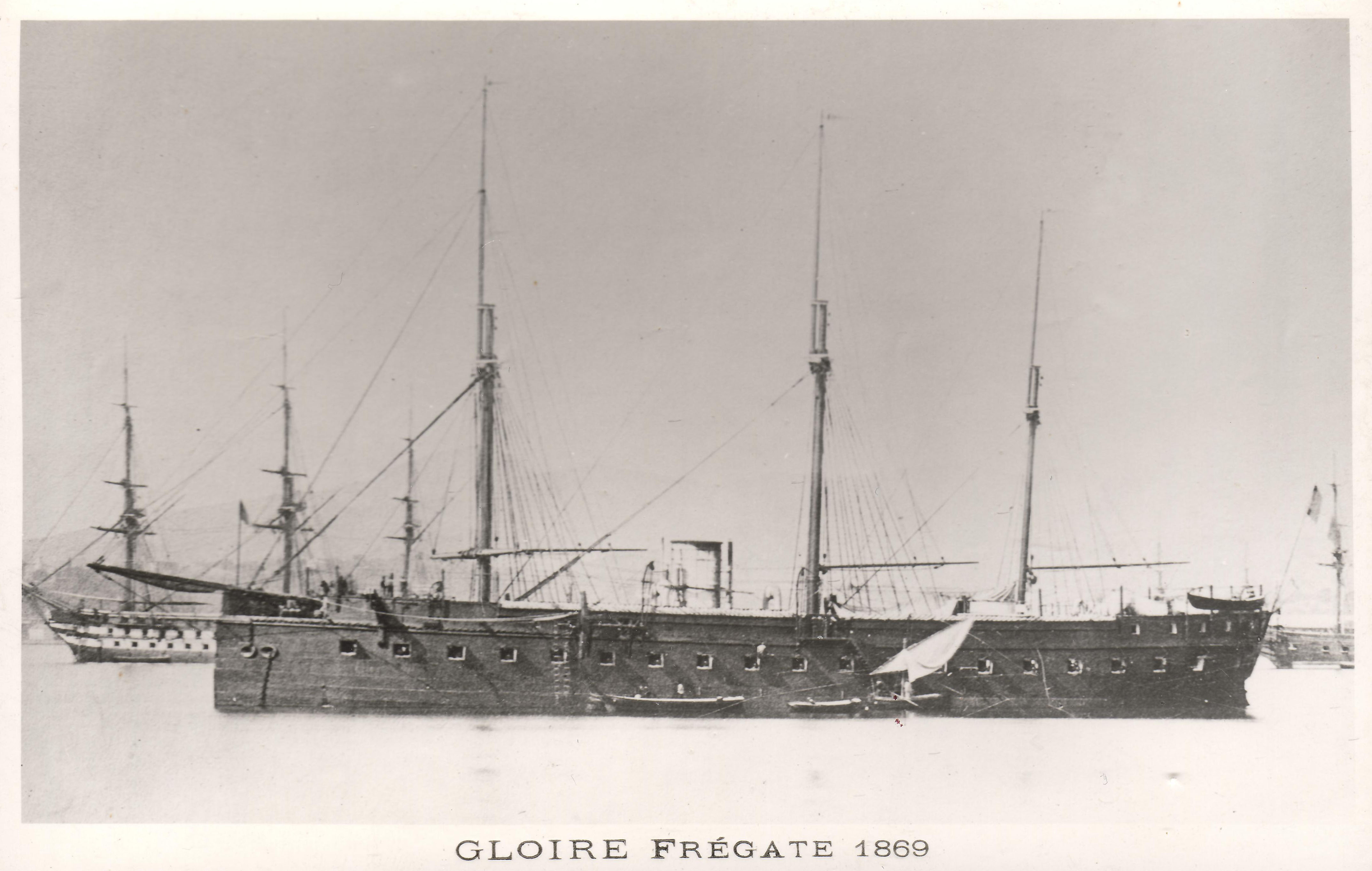
Gloire (1859), the first ocean-going ironclad warship

As amply demonstrated at the Battle of Sinop, and again during the Anglo-French blockade of Sevastopol from 1854 to 1855, wooden ships had become vulnerable to shell-firing guns. This prompted the French emperor Napoleon III to order the first ironclad warships: the Dévastation-class ironclad floating batteries. Three of these ships led the Anglo-French attack on the Russian fortress on the Kinburn Peninsula in the Battle of Kinburn in 1855, where they bore the brunt of Russian artillery fire, but were not seriously damaged. The success of these ships prompted the French and British to order several similar vessels.

In March 1858, the French took development of the ironclad to its next logical step: a proper, ocean-going armored warship. This vessel, another design by Dupuy de Lôme, was Gloire, and after her launching in 1859, Napoleon III ordered another five similar ships, which sparked a naval arms race with Britain. The first French ironclads had the profile of a ship of the line, cut to one deck due to weight considerations. Although made of wood and reliant on sail for most journeys, Gloire and her contemporaries were fitted with screw propellers, and their wooden hulls were protected by a layer of thick iron armor. Britain responded promptly with Warrior, a similar but much larger ironclad with an iron hull. By the time Warrior was completed in 1861, another nine ironclads were under construction in British shipyards, some of which were conversions of screw ships of the line that were already being built.

During the Unification of Italy in 1860, the Kingdom of Sardinia entered the ironclad building race by ordering the Formidabile-class ironclads from French shipyards; their long-term rival across the Adriatic Sea, the Austrian Empire, quickly responded later that year with the two Drache-class ironclads. Spain and Russia ordered ironclads in 1861, as did the United States and rebel Confederate States of America after the start of the American Civil War. Construction of these large and expensive warships remained controversial until March 1862, when news of the Battle of Hampton Roads, fought between the Union USS Monitor and the Confederate CSS Virginia, firmly settled debate in favor of even larger construction programs.

From the 1860s to 1880s, navies experimented with the positioning of guns in turrets, central batteries, or barbettes; ironclads of the period also prominently used the ram as a principal weapon. As steam technology developed, masts were gradually removed from battleship designs. The British Chief Constructor, Edward Reed, produced the Devastation-class ironclads in 1869. These were mastless turret ships, which adopted twin-screw propulsion and an arrangement of two pairs of 12-inch (305 mm) guns, one fore and one aft of the superstructure, that prefigured the advent of the pre-dreadnought battleship some two decades later. By the mid-1870s steel was used as a construction material alongside iron and wood. The French Navy's Redoutable, laid down in 1873 and launched in 1876, was a combination central battery and barbette ship, which became the first capital ship in the world to use steel as the principal building material.

The rapid pace of technological developments, particularly in terms of gun capabilities and thickness of armor to combat them, quickly rendered ships obsolescent. In the continuous attempt by gun manufacturers to keep ahead of developments in armor plate, larger and larger guns were fitted to many of the later ironclads. Some of these, such as the British Victoria class, carried guns as large as 16.25 inches (413 mm) in diameter, while the Italian Duilio-class ironclads were armed with colossal 17.7-inch (450 mm) guns. The French experimented with very large guns in the 1870s, but after significant trouble with these guns (and the development of slower-burning gunpowder), they led the way toward smaller-caliber guns with longer barrels, which had higher muzzle velocity and thus greater penetration than the larger guns.

=== Jeune École ===
In the 1880s, opposition to fleets of large, expensive ironclads arose around the world, but most notably in France, where a group of naval officers led by Admiral Théophile Aube formed the Jeune École (Young School). The theory, which held as one of its core tenets that small, cheap torpedo boats could easily defeat ironclads, was based on combat experience during the Russo-Turkish War of 1877–1878. The doctrine also posited that modern steel-hulled cruisers could defeat a more powerful navy by attacking the country's merchant shipping, rather than engage in a direct battle. The concept proved to be highly influential for several years, shaping the construction programs of France, Germany, Italy, and Austria-Hungary, among others throughout the world.

== Development of the modern battleship ==
=== Pre-dreadnought battleships ===
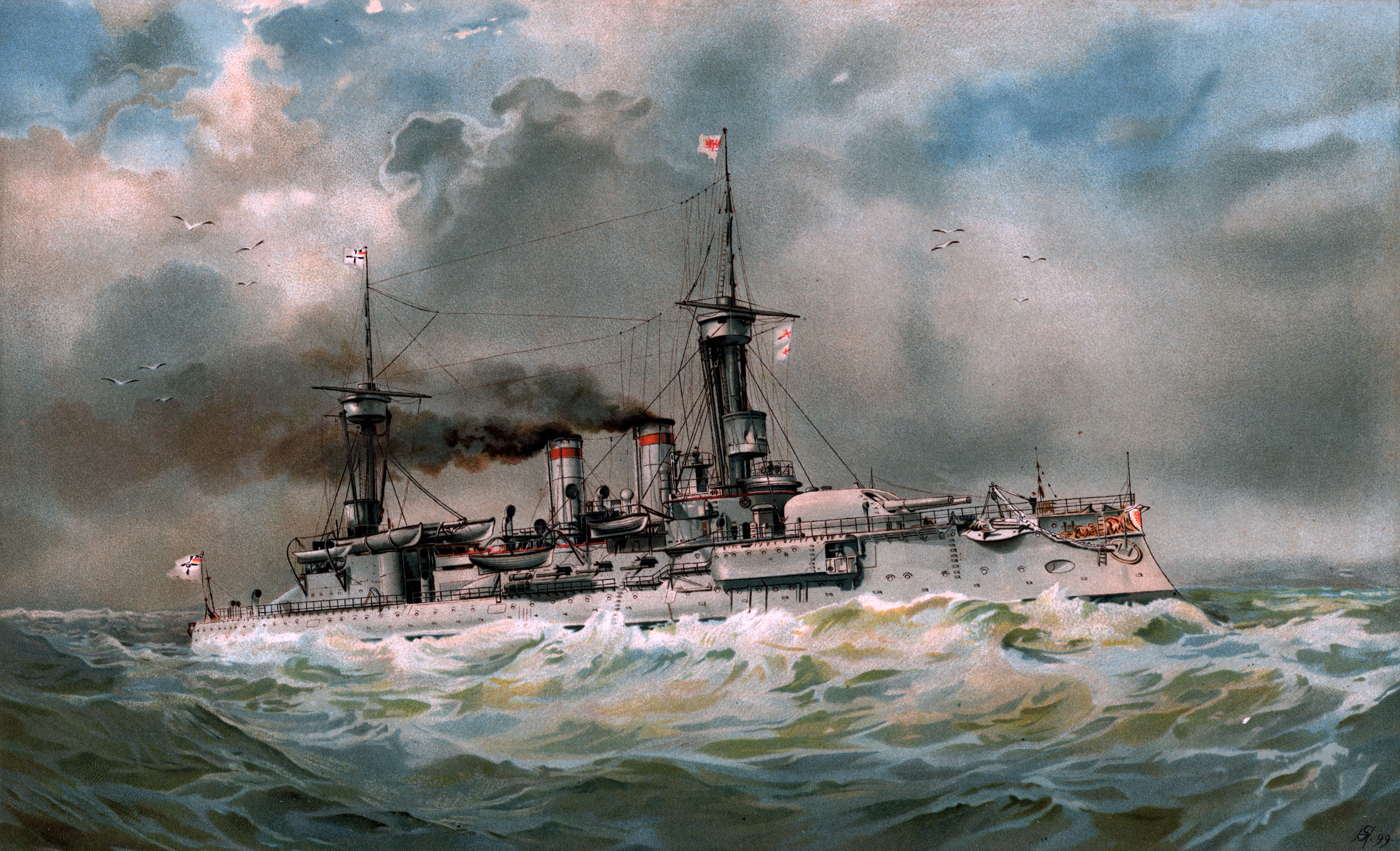
The German Brandenburg, which carried six heavy guns, rather than the standard four

In 1889, the British government passed the Naval Defence Act 1889, which embarked on a major naval construction program aimed at establishing the so-called two-power standard, whereby the Royal Navy would be stronger than the next two largest navies combined. The plan saw the construction of the eight Royal Sovereign-class battleships, which have been regarded as the first class of battleship that would retrospectively be referred to as "pre-dreadnought battleships". These large battleships incorporated a number of major improvements over earlier vessels like the Devastations, including a high freeboard for true ocean-going capability, more extensive armor protection, heavier secondary battery guns, and greater speed. The ships were armed with four 13.5 in (340 mm) guns in two twin mounts, fore and aft, which established the pattern for subsequent battleships. (Note: Sondhaus states that the Royal Sovereigns "...set the standard for battleship construction for the next seventeen years, until their general concept was rendered obsolete by the all-big-gun Dreadnought.) After building a trio of smaller second-class battleships intended for the colonial empire, Britain followed with the nine-strong Majestic-class battleships in 1893–1895, which improved on the basic Royal Sovereign design. These ships adopted the 12 in (305 mm) gun, which would become the standard for all subsequent British pre-dreadnoughts.

Foreign navies quickly began pre-dreadnoughts of their own; France began Brennus in 1889, and Germany laid down four Brandenburg-class battleships in 1890. The United States Navy laid down three Indiana-class battleships in 1891, the same year work began on the Russian battleship Tri Sviatitelia. Japan ordered the two Fuji-class battleships from British yards, to an improved Royal Sovereign design, in 1894. The Austro-Hungarian Navy eventually ordered its own pre-dreadnoughts, beginning with the Habsburg class in 1899. All of these ships carried guns of between 11 and 13.4 in (280 and 340 mm), save the Austro-Hungarian vessels, which, being significantly smaller than the rest, only carried 9.4 in (240 mm) guns.

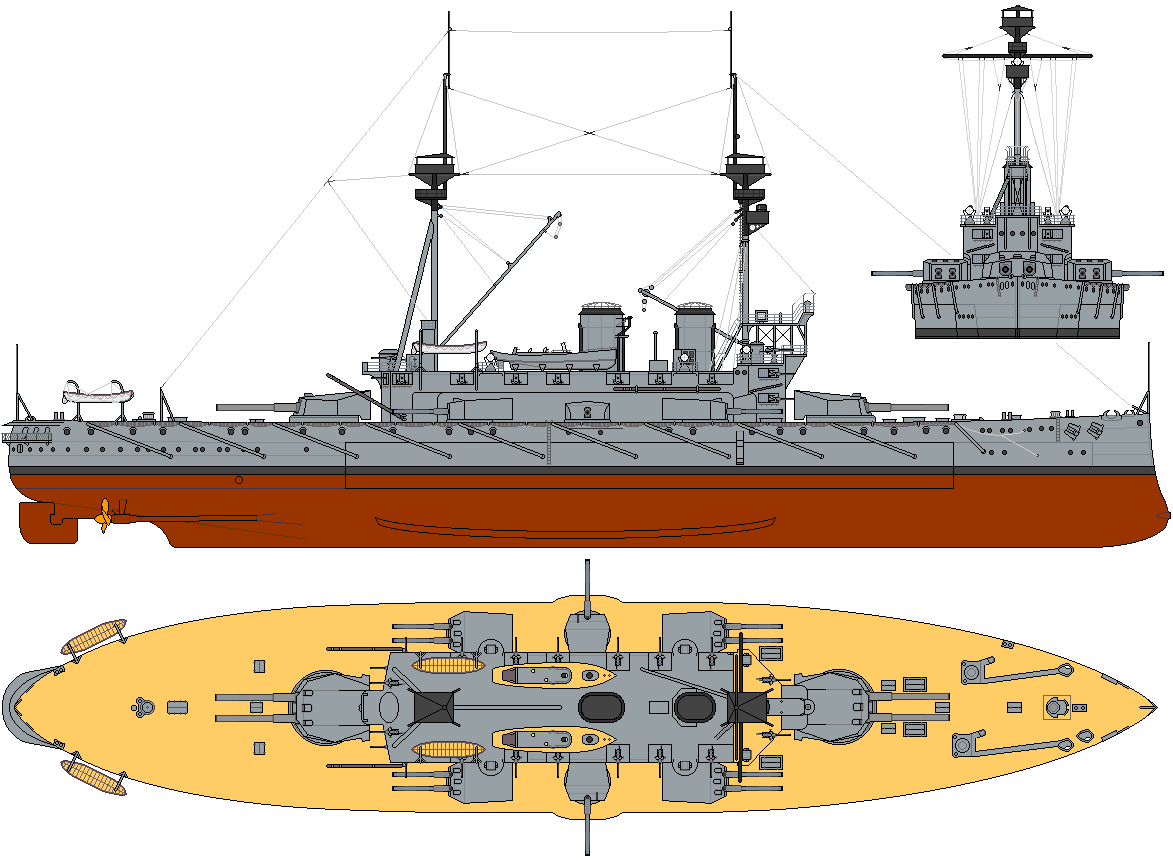
Diagram of HMS Agamemnon (1908), a typical late pre-dreadnought battleship

Most pre-dreadnoughts followed the same general pattern, which typically saw a ship armed with four large guns, usually 12-inch weapons, along with a secondary armament of medium-caliber guns (usually 5 to 6 in (127 to 152 mm) guns early in the period), which were also intended for combat at close range with other battleships. They also generally carried a light armament for defense against torpedo boats and other light craft. Some ships varied from this general pattern, such as the American Indianas, which carried a heavier secondary battery of 8-inch (203 mm) guns, and the German Brandenburgs, which had six 11-inch guns instead of the usual four heavy guns. Many of the early French pre-dreadnoughts, such as Charles Martel, carried a mixed heavy armament of two 12-inch and two 10.8-inch (274 mm) guns.

Pre-dreadnoughts continued the technical innovations of the ironclad throughout the 1890s and early 1900s. Compound armor gave way to much stronger Harvey armor developed in the United States in 1890, which was in turn superseded by the German Krupp armor in 1894. As armor became stronger, it could be reduced in thickness considerably, which saved weight that could be allocated to other aspects of the ship design, and generally permitted larger and more capable battleships. At the same time, the advent of smokeless powder continued the trend begun in the French Navy of comparatively smaller guns firing at higher velocities. Early on in the pre-dreadnought era, most navies standardized on the 12-inch gun; only Germany remained the significant outlier, relying on 11-inch and even 9.4-inch guns for its pre-dreadnoughts. Similarly, later in the pre-dreadnought era, the secondary batteries grew in caliber, usually to 7 to 8 in (178 to 203 mm) guns. Some final classes, such as the British Lord Nelson class with a secondary battery of 9.2-inch (234 mm) guns, or the French Danton class that had 9.4-inch secondaries, have been subsequently referred to as "semi-dreadnoughts", reflecting their transitional step between classic pre-dreadnought designs and the all-big-gun battleships that would soon appear.

In the last years of the 19th century and the first years of the 20th, the escalation in the building of battleships became an arms race between Britain and Germany. The German naval laws of 1890 and 1898 authorized a fleet of 38 battleships, a vital threat to the balance of naval power. Britain answered with further shipbuilding, but by the end of the pre-dreadnought era, British supremacy at sea had markedly weakened. In 1883, the United Kingdom had 38 ironclad battleships, twice as many as France and almost as many as the rest of the world put together. In 1897, Britain's lead was far smaller due to competition from France, Germany, and Russia, as well as the development of pre-dreadnought fleets in Italy, the United States, and Japan. The Ottoman Empire, Spain, Sweden, Denmark, Norway, the Netherlands, Chile, and Brazil all had second-rate fleets led by armored cruisers, coastal defense ships, or monitors.

==== Early combat experiences ====
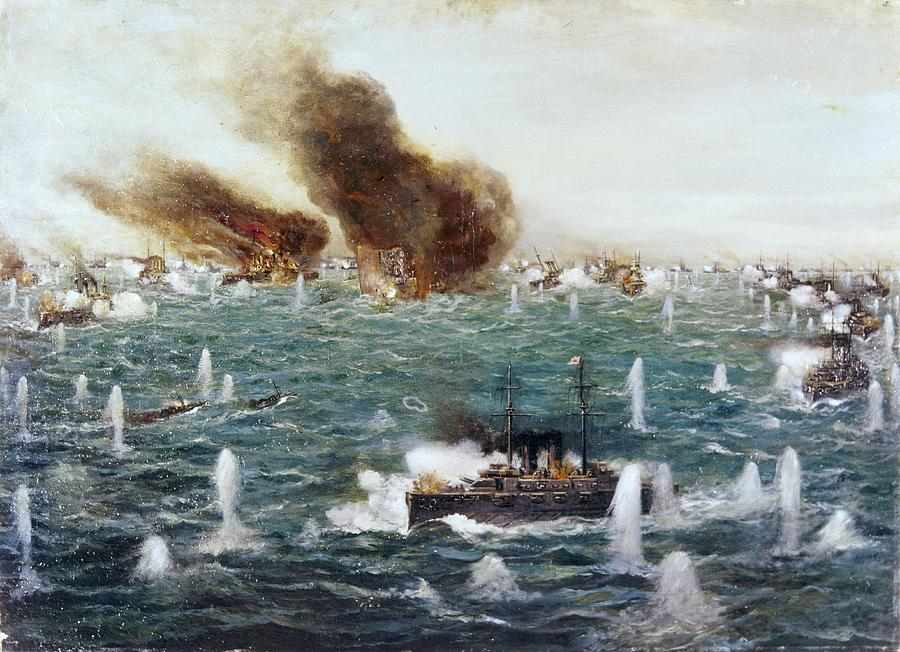
Painting of the Battle of Tsushima, 1905

Pre-dreadnought battleships received their first test in combat in the Spanish–American War in 1898 at the Battle of Santiago de Cuba. An American squadron that included four pre-dreadnoughts had blockaded a Spanish squadron of four armored cruisers in Santiago de Cuba until 3 July, when the Spanish ships attempted to break through and escape. All four cruisers were destroyed in the ensuing engagement, as were a pair of Spanish destroyers, and the American ships received little damage in return. The battle seemed to indicate that the mixed batteries of pre-dreadnought battleships were very effective, as the medium-caliber guns had inflicted most of the damage (which reinforced the observations of the Battle of Manila Bay, where only cruisers armed with medium guns had been present). It also led navies around the world to begin working on better solutions for rangefinding in the hope of improving gunnery at longer ranges.

Conflicting colonial ambitions in Korea and Manchuria led Russia and Japan to the next major use of pre-dreadnoughts in combat. During the Russo-Japanese War of 1904–1905, squadrons of battleships engaged in a number of battles, including the Battle of the Yellow Sea and the Battle of Tsushima. Naval mines also proved to be a deadly threat to battleships on both sides, sinking the Russian Petropavlovsk in March 1904 and the Japanese battleships Hatsuse and Yashima on the same day in May. The action in the Yellow Sea began during a Russian attempt to break out of Port Arthur, which the Japanese under Admiral Tōgō Heihachirō had blockaded. The Russians outmaneuvered the Japanese and briefly escaped, but the latter's superior speed allowed them to catch up. A 12-inch shell struck the Russian flagship, killing the squadron commander and causing the Russian ships to fall into disarray and retreat back to Port Arthur. With night falling, the Japanese broke off and reimposed the blockade. At Tsushima, Togo outmaneuvered the Russian Second Pacific Squadron that had been sent to reinforce the Pacific Fleet, and the Japanese battleships quickly inflicted fatal damage with long-range fire from their 12-inch guns.

In both actions during the Russo-Japanese War, the fleets engaged at longer range (as far as 12,000 yd (11,000 m) at the Yellow Sea), where only their 12-inch guns were effective. Only in the final stages of the battle at Tsushima, by which time the Russian fleet had been severely damaged and most of its modern battleships sunk or disabled, did the Japanese fleet close to effective range of their secondary guns, fighting as close as 2,700 yd (2,500 m). The actions, particularly the decisive engagement at Tsushima, demonstrated that the lessons taken from the Spanish–American War were incorrect, and that the large-caliber gun should be the only offensive weapon carried by battleships.

=== Dreadnought battleships ===
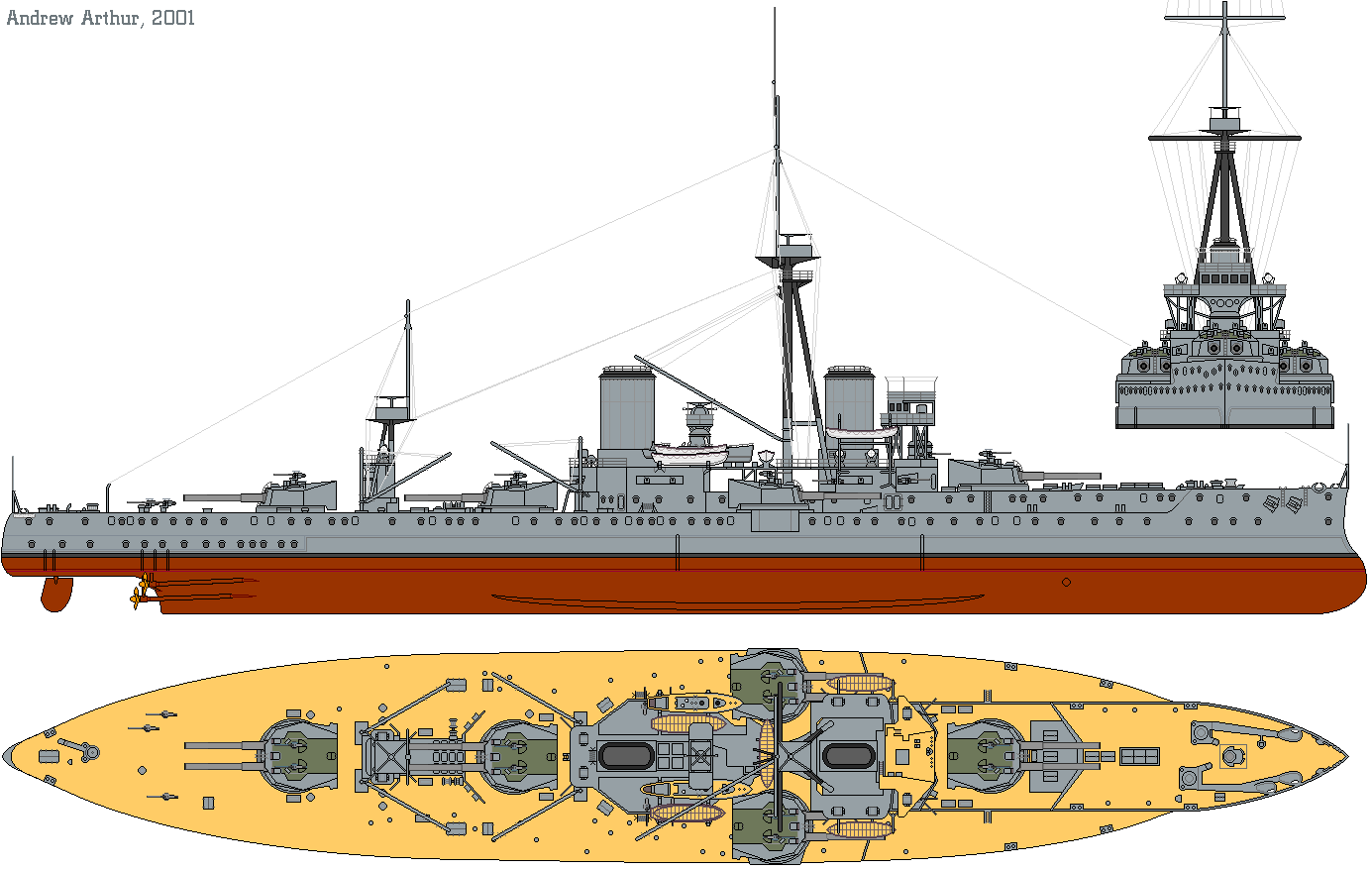
HMS Dreadnought (1906)

In the early 1900s, some naval theorists had begun to argue for future battleships to discard the heavy secondary batteries and instead carry only big guns. The first prominent example was Vittorio Cuniberti, the chief engineer of the Italian Regia Marina (Royal Navy); he published an article in 1903 titled "An Ideal Battleship for the British Navy" in Jane's Fighting Ships. By the time that British Admiral Sir John ("Jackie") Fisher became the First Sea Lord in late 1904, he had already become convinced that a similar concept—that of a fast capital ship carrying the largest quick-firing guns available (which at that time were 9.2 in (234 mm) weapons)—was the path forward. The Japanese Navy was the first to actually order any of these new ships, beginning with the two Satsuma-class battleships in 1904, though due to shortages of 12-inch guns, they were completed with a mix of 12- and 10-inch (254 mm) guns. By early 1905, Fisher had converted to the 12-inch gun for his proposed new capital ships, and in March that year, the German Navy had decided to build an all-big-gun battleship for the planned Nassau class. The American South Carolina class was authorized in 1905, but work did not begin until December 1906.

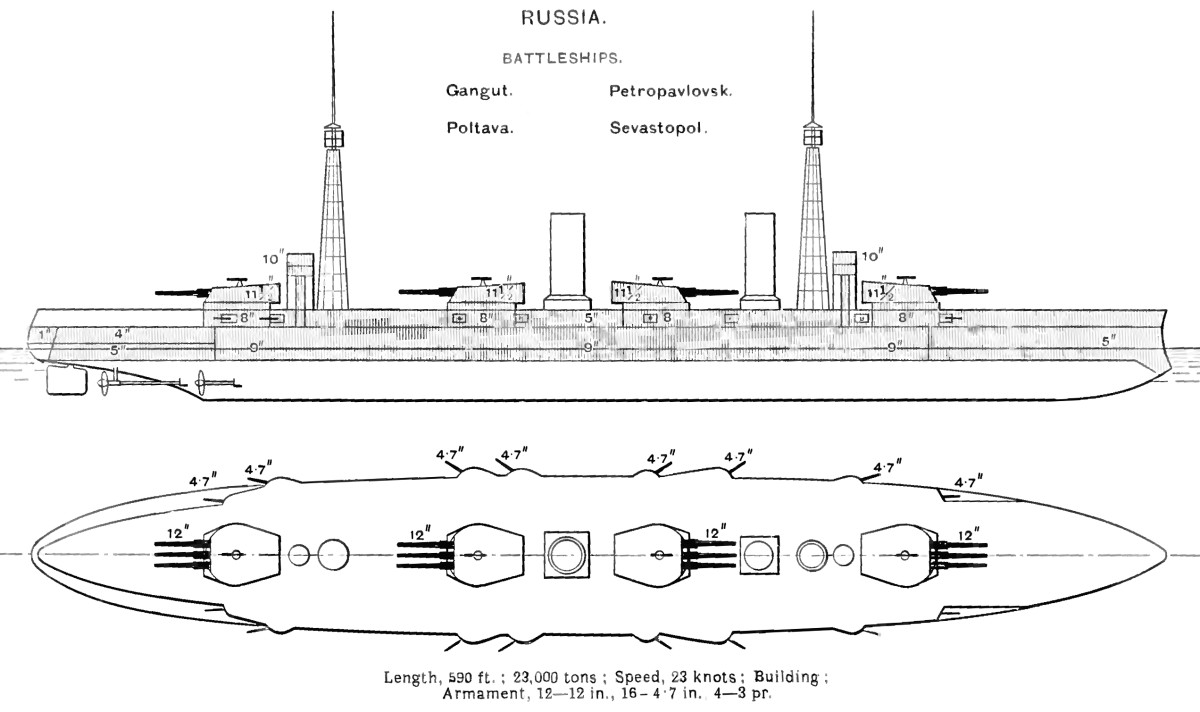
Plan and profile of the Gangut-class battleships as depicted in Brassey's Naval Annual 1912

Though several navies had begun design work on all-big-gun battleships, the first to be completed was the British Dreadnought, which had been ordered by Fisher. He actually preferred a very large armored cruiser equipped with an all-big-gun armament, which would come to be known as the battlecruiser, and he only included Dreadnought in his 1905 construction program to appease naval officers who favored continued battleship building. Fisher believed that Britain's security against the French and Russian threats would be better guaranteed by squadrons of fast battlecruisers, three of which were laid down in 1906. Regardless of Fisher's intentions, the rapidly changing strategic calculus invalidated his plans and ensured that when the 1906–1907 program was being debated, Germany would be Britain's primary rival, the Royal Navy chose to build three more dreadnoughts instead of further battlecruisers. Reactions from the other naval powers were immediate; very few pre-dreadnoughts were built afterward, and in the first seven years of the ensuing arms race, all of the major naval powers either had their own dreadnoughts in service or nearing completion. Of these competitions, the Anglo-German race was the most significant, though others took place, such as the South American contest. Even naval powers of the second and third rank, such as Spain; Brazil, Chile, and Argentina in South America; and Greece and the Ottoman Empire in the Mediterranean, had begun dreadnought programs, either domestically or by ordering abroad.

Dreadnought carried ten 12-inch guns, all in twin turrets: one was forward, two further aft, all on the centerline, and the remaining pair were wing turrets with more restricted arcs of fire. She disposed of the medium-caliber secondary battery and carried only 3-inch (76 mm) guns for anti-torpedo boat work. A variety of experimental arrangements followed, including the "hexagonal" layout adopted by the German Nassaus (which had four of their six twin turrets on the "wings"), or the Italian Dante Alighieri and Russian Gangut-class battleships that mounted their guns all on the centerline, but with restricted arcs of fire for half of the guns. The South Carolinas dispensed with Dreadnought's wing turrets, adopting instead a superfiring arrangement of eight guns in four twin turrets, which gave them the same broadside as Dreadnought, despite having two fewer guns.

Technological development continued over the decade that followed Dreadnought's launch. Already by 1910, the British had begun the first of the so-called "super-dreadnoughts" that carried significantly more powerful 13.5-inch (340 mm) guns, all on the centerline. The United States followed suit in 1911, though increasing the caliber of their guns to 14 inches (356 mm). France adopted a 13.4 in (340 mm) gun for its Bretagne-class battleships, laid down in 1912. That year, Japan laid down the first of its Fusō-class battleships, also armed with a 14-inch main battery. The Germans waited until 1913, but skipped directly to 15-inch (381 mm) guns. By this time, Britain had led the way to the 15-inch gun with the Queen Elizabeth class begun in late 1912. But more importantly than the increase of caliber, the Queen Elizabeths were the first completely oil-fired battleships and the first fast battleships. At around the same time, the United States introduced the next major innovation in battleship design: the all or nothing armor system in the Nevada class laid down in 1912. The heaviest possible armor was used to protect the ship's propulsion machinery and ammunition magazines, but intermediate protection was stripped away from non-essential areas, since this mid-weight armor only served to detonate armor-piercing shells.

== World War I ==
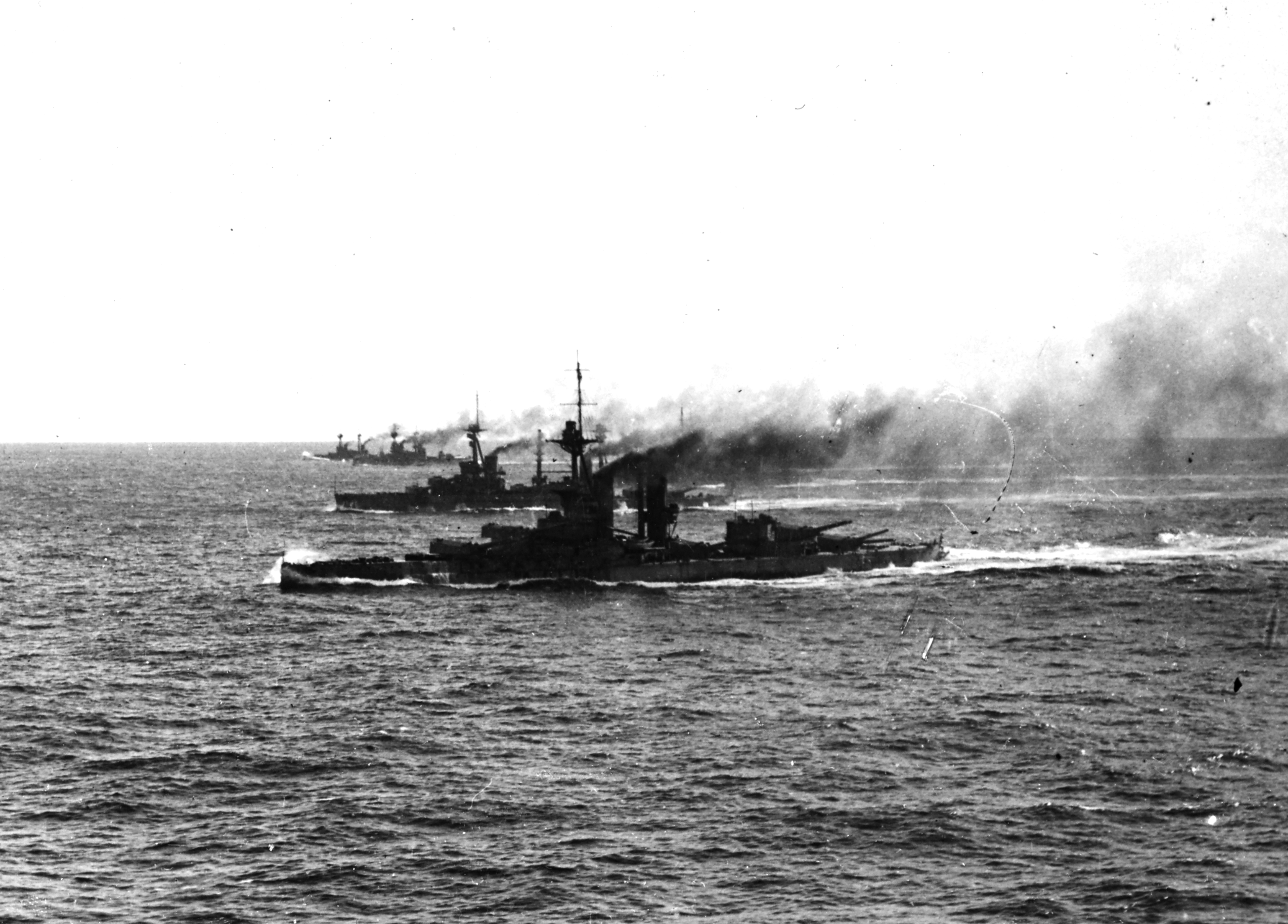
The 4th Battle Squadron in 1915; the closest vessel is either HMS Benbow or Emperor of India

By the start of World War I in July 1914, the Royal Navy's Grand Fleet outnumbered the German High Seas Fleet by 21 to 13 in numbers of dreadnought battleships and 4 to 3 in battlecruisers. And over the course of the war, Britain would add another 14 dreadnoughts, while Germany completed another 6. (Note: Curiously, Herwig states that "Germany [added] 2 Dreadnoughts to [its]...fleet", seemingly referring to the two Bayern-class battleships completed in 1916, but omitting the four König-class battleships that entered service in the first months of the war.) German strategy presumed that Britain would launch an immediate offensive into the southern North Sea, but the British preferred to establish a distant blockade, which very quickly stopped German maritime trade. Both sides were aware that, because of the greater number of British dreadnoughts, a full fleet engagement would be likely to result in a British victory. The German strategy was therefore to try to provoke an engagement on their terms: either to induce a part of the Grand Fleet to enter battle alone, or to fight a pitched battle near the German coastline, where friendly minefields, torpedo-boats and submarines could be used to even the odds. The British fleet commander, Admiral John Jellicoe, refused to be drawn into unfavorable conditions and enforced the blockade at the English Channel and between Scotland and Norway.

In the Baltic Sea, Germany found itself in the reverse situation, in an even more lopsided fashion versus its Russian opponent. The Russian Baltic Fleet had only four dreadnoughts at the start of the war, so they adopted a purely defensive approach to guard the capital at Petrograd and the northern flank of the Russian army units fighting on the Eastern Front. In the Mediterranean Sea, Italy initially remained neutral, despite being a member of the Triple Alliance with Germany and Austria-Hungary, leaving the latter to face the French Navy and British Mediterranean Fleet alone. After ensuring the French army units in French North Africa were safely convoyed to France, the French fleet sailed to the Adriatic Sea to blockade the Austro-Hungarian fleet, which refused to leave their fortified bases. The French, like the other major European naval commanders, had failed to consider that their opponents would not concede to engaging in battle on terms unfavorable to them. The Adriatic quickly turned into another stalemate as the threat of Austro-Hungarian mines and submarines prevented a more aggressive employment of the French fleet.

Painting of a König-class ship under fire at Jutland by Claus Bergen

The Germans embarked on a number of sweeps into the North Sea and raids on British coastal towns to draw out part of the Grand Fleet, which would be isolated and destroyed. These included the raid on Scarborough, Hartlepool and Whitby, where the Germans nearly caught an isolated British battle squadron, but turned away, thinking that it was the entire Grand Fleet. This strategy ultimately led to the Battle of Jutland on 31 May – 1 June 1916, the largest clash of battleship fleets. The first stage of the battle was fought largely by the two sides' battlecruiser squadrons, though the British were supported by four of the Queen Elizabeth-class battleships. After both battleship fleets engaged, the British crossed the Germans' "T" twice, but the latter managed to extricate themselves from the action as darkness fell. Early on 1 June, the High Seas Fleet had reached port. In the course of the fighting, three British battlecruisers were destroyed, as was one German battlecruiser and the old pre-dreadnought Pommern. Numerous cruisers and destroyers were lost on both sides as well.

The Germans made two further offensive operations in the months after Jutland. The first, which led to the inconclusive action of 19 August, saw one German battleship torpedoed by a British submarine and two British cruisers sunk by German U-boats. This incident convinced the British that the risks posed by submarines were too great to send the Grand Fleet into the southern North Sea, barring exceptional circumstances like a German invasion of Britain. In the second German operation, which took place on 18–19 October, a German cruiser was damaged by a submarine and the Grand Fleet remained in port. By this time, the Germans were similarly convinced of the futility of their attempts to isolate part of the British fleet, and discontinued such raids. They instead turned to unrestricted submarine warfare, which resulted in their battleships being reduced to a supporting force that guarded the U-boat bases.

In the Baltic, the Germans made two attempts to capture the islands in the Gulf of Riga. The first came in August 1915, and in the ensuing Battle of the Gulf of Riga, a pair of German dreadnoughts engaged in an artillery duel at long range with the Russian pre-dreadnought Slava guarding the minefields that protected the gulf. The Germans drove off the Russian ship, cleared the minefield, but by the time they entered the gulf, submarines had reportedly arrived. Unwilling to risk the battleships in the shallow, confined waters of the gulf, the Germans retreated. The second attempt—Operation Albion—took place in October 1917. During the Battle of Moon Sound, another pair of German dreadnoughts damaged Slava so badly that she had to be scuttled, and the Germans completed their amphibious assault on the islands.

The modern units of the French and British fleets in the Mediterranean spent much of the war guarding the entrance to the Adriatic, first based at Malta and later moving to Corfu. They saw very little action through the war. In May 1915, Italy entered the war on the side of the Triple Entente, declaring war on their former allies; the Austro-Hungarians, who were prepared for the betrayal, sailed with the bulk of their fleet to raid the Italian coast on the first hours of the war on 24 May; the battleships were sent to bombard Ancona, but there were no heavy Italian or French units close enough to intervene. For their part, the Italians were content to reinforce the blockading force guarding the Adriatic, as they, too, were unwilling to risk their capital ships in the mine- and submarine-infested waters of the Austrian Littoral. Instead, light forces carried out most of the operations. Meanwhile, several French and British pre-dreadnoughts were sent to attack the Ottoman defenses guarding the Dardanelles. In the ensuing naval operations from February to March 1915, several battleships were sunk or damaged by mines and torpedoes. When the fleets failed to break through the defenses, the British and French decided to land at Gallipoli to try to take the fortifications by land; the remaining battleships were thereafter used to provide naval gunfire support. This, too, ultimately failed, and by January 1916, the British and French withdrew their troops.

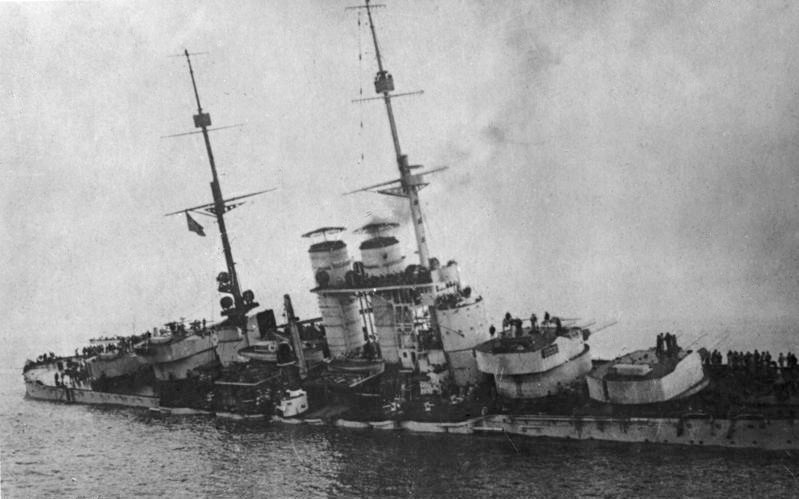
The sinking of SMS Szent István, after being torpedoed by Italian motor boats

Russian battleships saw more action in the Black Sea against their Ottoman opponents. The Ottomans had the battlecruiser Yavuz Sultan Selim (formerly the German Goeben), which the Russians attempted to destroy in a series of short engagements, including the Battle of Cape Sarych in November 1914, the Action of 10 May 1915, and the Action of 8 January 1916, though they were unsuccessful in all three attempts, primarily because the faster Yavuz Sultan Selim could easily escape from the more numerous but slow Russian pre-dreadnoughts. By 1916, the Russians had completed a pair of dreadnoughts in the Black Sea, which severely curtailed Ottoman freedom of maneuver.

In the course of the war, older pre-dreadnoughts proved to be highly vulnerable to underwater damage, whether by naval mine or ship-launched or submarine-delivered torpedoes. HMS Formidable was sunk by a German U-boat in the English Channel in 1915. At the Dardanelles, HMS Majestic was sunk by a German U-boat, and HMS Goliath was sunk by the Ottoman destroyer Muavenet-i Milliye. The British Ocean and Irresistible and the French Bouvet were all sunk by mines. HMS Russell and HMS Cornwallis were both sunk by mines in the Mediterranean in 1916 and 1917, respectively. HMS King Edward VII was similarly mined and sunk off the British coast in 1916, and HMS Britannia was sunk by a U-boat in the final days of the war. The French Gaulois and Suffren were sunk by U-boats in 1916, and Danton was torpedoed and sunk by a U-boat in 1917. At Jutland, the only battleship lost was the old pre-dreadnought Pommern, which was torpedoed by a destroyer.

In contrast, dreadnoughts proved to be much more resilient to underwater attack. HMS Marlborough was damaged by a torpedo at Jutland, but nevertheless returned to port. The German SMS Westfalen was torpedoed at the action of 19 August 1916, and SMS Grosser Kurfürst and Kronprinz were torpedoed by the same submarine in November 1917; all three survived. SMS Bayern was mined during Operation Albion and remained in action against Russian artillery batteries for some time thereafter. Dreadnoughts lost to underwater attack were rare. HMS Audacious was sunk by a mine in October 1914, the Austro-Hungarian SMS Szent István was sunk by Italian MAS boats in June 1918, and five months later, Italian frogmen sank Viribus Unitis using a powerful limpet mine.

== Interwar period ==
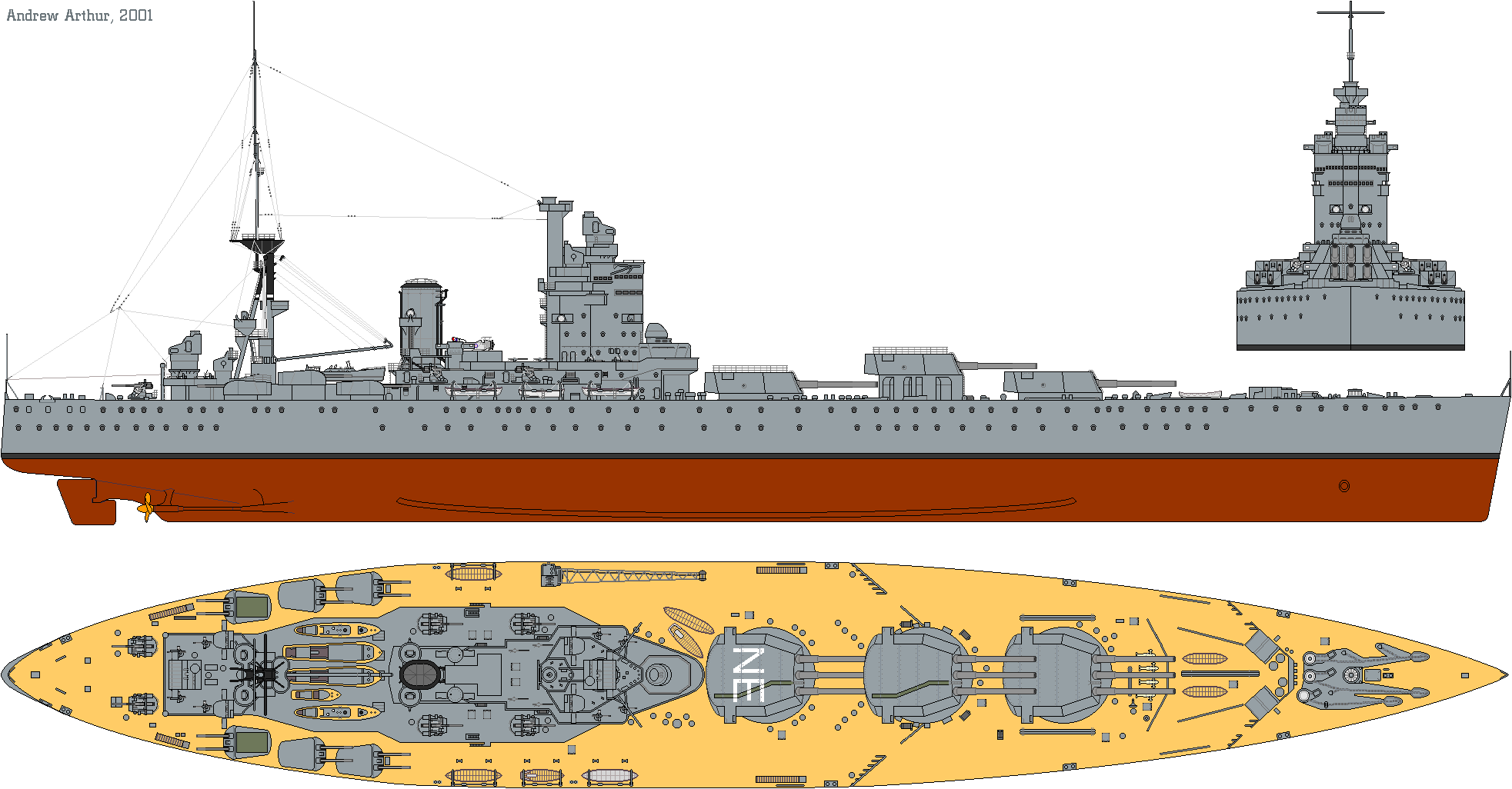
Profile drawing of HMS Nelson commissioned 1927

In the immediate aftermath of the war, the most modern units of the German fleet were interned at Scapa Flow, where in June 1919, their crews scuttled the fleet to avoid it being handed over to the Allies. The remaining dreadnoughts still in German ports were therefore seized as compensation for the scuttled ships. The postwar Reichsmarine of Weimar Germany was limited to a contingent of eight old pre-dreadnoughts (of which two would be kept in reserve) under the terms of the Treaty of Versailles; new battleships were subject to severe restrictions on size and armament. The surviving battleships of Austria-Hungary, the other defeated Central Power, were soon distributed among the Allies, to be broken up.

While the other major naval powers remained free to build new battleships, most of them were financially crippled after the war. The prospect of a renewed naval arms race between the United States, United Kingdom, and Japan appealed to few politicians in the three countries, and so they concluded the Washington Naval Treaty in 1922, which also included Italy and France. The treaty limited the number and size of battleships, and imposed a ten-year building holiday, along with other provisions. The treaty also imposed a ratio of 5:5:3 on total displacement of battleships for the US, UK, and Japan, respectively, and it severed the Anglo-Japanese Alliance. The only exceptions to the building holiday were for the two British Nelson-class battleships, which were permitted to give Britain parity with the latest American and Japanese battleships, which were all armed with 16-inch (406 mm) guns.

The Washington treaty was followed by a series of other naval treaties, including the First London Naval Treaty (1930) and the Second London Naval Treaty (1936), which both set additional limits on major warships. The treaty limitations meant that fewer new battleships were launched in 1919–1939 than in 1905–1914. The treaties also inhibited development by imposing upper limits on the weights of ships. Designs like the projected British N3-class battleship, the first American South Dakota class, and the Japanese Kii class—all of which continued the trend to larger ships with bigger guns and thicker armor—never got off the drawing board. Those designs which were commissioned during this period were referred to as treaty battleships. The collapse of the treaty system began during the negotiations for the Second London Treaty, where Japan demanded parity with Britain and the US, which the latter two flatly rejected. Japan withdrew from the treaty system in 1936, though the agreements remained in effect until January 1937.

=== Rise of air power ===
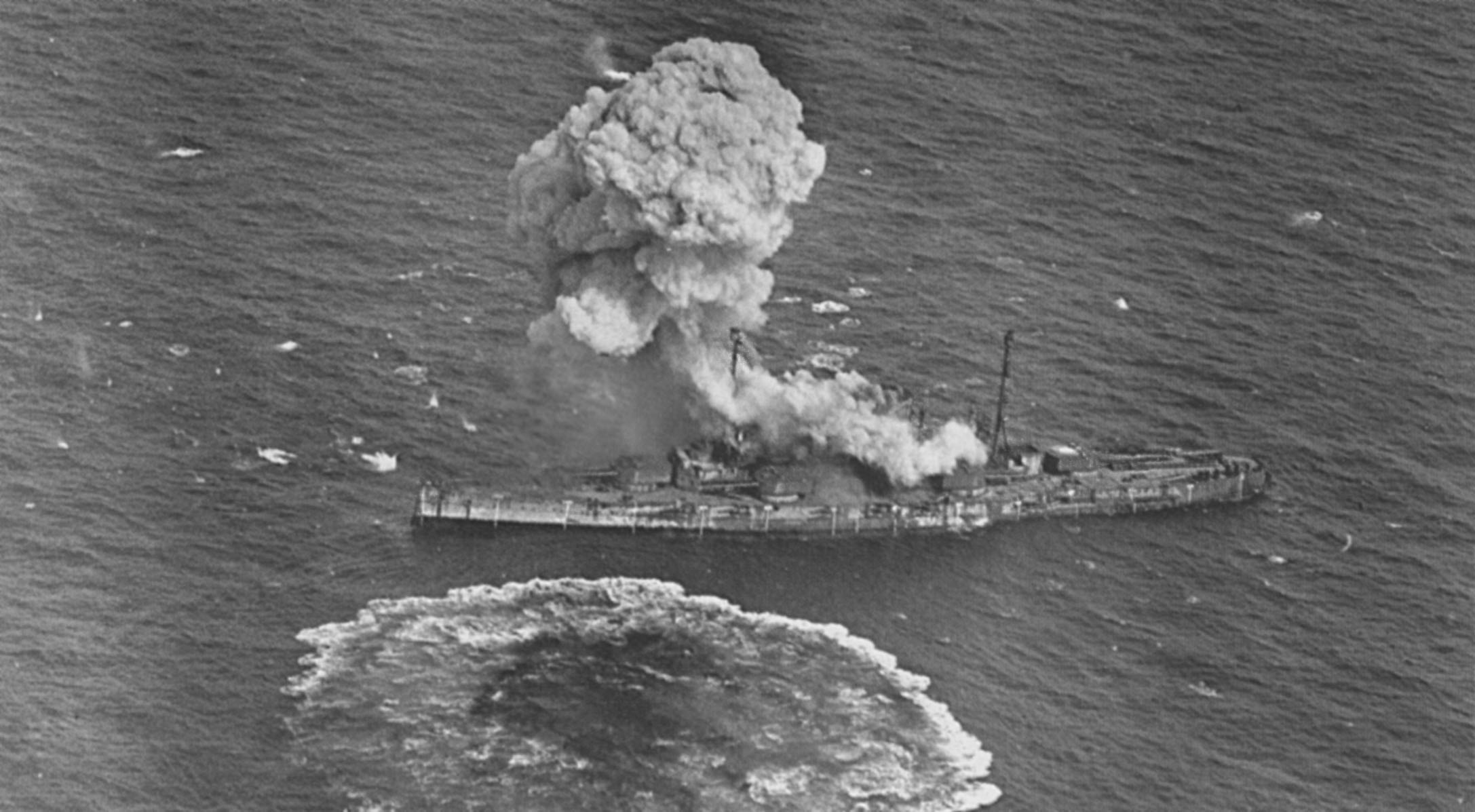
Bombing tests which sank SMS Ostfriesland (1909), September 1921

As early as 1914, the British Admiral Percy Scott predicted that battleships would soon be made irrelevant by aircraft. Between 1916 and 1918, US Admiral William Fullam published a series of papers stating that aircraft would become an independent strike arm of the fleet, and he argued that the Lexington-class battlecruisers then under construction should be converted to aircraft carriers rather than be scrapped. By the end of World War I, aircraft had successfully adopted the torpedo as a weapon. In 1921 the Italian general and air theorist Giulio Douhet completed a hugely influential treatise on strategic bombing titled The Command of the Air, which foresaw the dominance of air power over conventional military and naval forces.

In 1921, US General Billy Mitchell used the ex-German dreadnought SMS Ostfriesland in a series of bombing tests conducted by the Navy and Army. The test involved a series of attacks on the stationary, unmanned ships using low-level, land-based bombers dropping bombs that ranged from 550 to 2,000 pounds (250 to 910 kg). Ostfriesland was sunk by the heaviest bombs, though Mitchell broke the rules of the tests and the subsequent report concluded that had the ship been crewed, underway, and firing back at the aircraft, damage control teams aboard Ostfriesland could have managed any damage inflicted. Mitchell and his supporters nevertheless embarked on a public campaign that falsely claimed that Ostfriesland was a super-battleship, and the quick sinking proved that battleships were obsolete. Mitchell would eventually be subjected to a court-martial, convicted, and discharged from the Army over his insubordinate tactics.

Naval aviation traces its origin back to the first decade of the 20th century, though early efforts were based on using aircraft to scout for the fleet and help direct gunfire at long range. A number of experimental aircraft carriers were employed during World War I, primarily by the Royal Navy, all converted from merchant vessels or existing warships. The US Navy completed its first carrier, USS Langley, in 1922. But aircraft carriers in the 1920s faced a number of challenges to be overcome: aircraft of the day were short-ranged, which meant the carrier had to be very close to the enemy to be able to launch and then recover a strike, which exposed the carriers to attack. In addition, the available planes had insufficient power to carry meaningful bomb loads. Early naval aviators nevertheless pioneered effective tactics like dive bombing during this period.

=== Fast battleships and the end of the treaty system ===
The Italian fast battleship Vittorio Veneto

Because the Washington Treaty system precluded the construction of any new battleships until the early 1930s, the major naval powers began a program of modernization for their most effective battleships. Britain conducted a series of refits to their Queen Elizabeth-class battleships through the 1920s, adding anti-torpedo bulges, additional anti-aircraft guns, and aircraft catapults; further refits in the 1930s increased armor protection and further strengthened their anti-aircraft batteries. The Revenge-class battleships were less heavily modified during the period. The US Florida, Wyoming class, and New York classes received similar treatments in the 1920s, while the Nevada and Pennsylvania classes received new turbines, additional armor, and more anti-aircraft guns. The Japanese similarly updated their Fusō, Ise, and Nagato-class battleships, and rebuilt three of the four Kongō-class battlecruisers into fast battleships, albeit with significantly inferior protection compared to the other ships. They all also received distinctive pagoda masts. Hiei was initially disarmed to serve as a training ship under the terms of the Washington Treaty, but was remilitarized in the late 1930s. In the 1930s, all four classes were lengthened and had their propulsion systems improved to increase their speeds.

The French and Italian navies were exempted from the 10-year building holiday, owing to the comparative obsolescence of their battleships; they were permitted to build 70,000 long tons (71,000 t) worth of battleships. But the weak economies of both countries led both to defer new construction until Germany began building the Deutschland class of heavily armed cruiser at the end of the 1920s. This prompted the French to build the Dunkerque class of small, fast battleships armed with 13 in (330 mm) guns, which led to a short arms race in Europe in the mid-1930s. The Italians responded with the significantly larger and more powerful Littorio class, armed with 15-inch guns. The French, in turn, began the Richelieu-class battleships to counter the Littorios. By this time, Nazi Germany had signed the Anglo-German Naval Agreement in 1935, which removed the restrictions imposed by Versailles and pegged German naval strength to 35% of British tonnage. This permitted the construction of two Scharnhorst-class battleships, which were also a response to the Dunkerques. The advent of the Richelieus prompted the Germans to build the two Bismarck-class battleships late in the decade. The Germans thereafter embarked on the ambitious Plan Z naval construction program, which included a total of eight battleships, of which the Bismarcks would be the first two.

Against the backdrop of European rearmament in the mid-1930s, Britain began planning its first battleship class in a decade: the King George V class. These were armed with 14-inch guns intended to comply with the terms of the Second London Naval Conference, and they were laid down in 1937. The United States began its North Carolina class at the same time, and though they were intended to be armed with 14-inch guns, Japan's refusal to agree to the Second London Treaty led the US to invoke a clause of the treaty that allowed an increase to 16-inch guns. In 1939, these were followed by the four South Dakota-class battleships, and in 1940 by the first of four Iowa-class battleships. For its part, Japan had decided to embark on a program of four very large Yamato-class battleships, armed with 18-inch (457 mm) guns, as early as 1934, though work did not begin on the first ship until late 1937.

== World War II ==
=== European theater ===
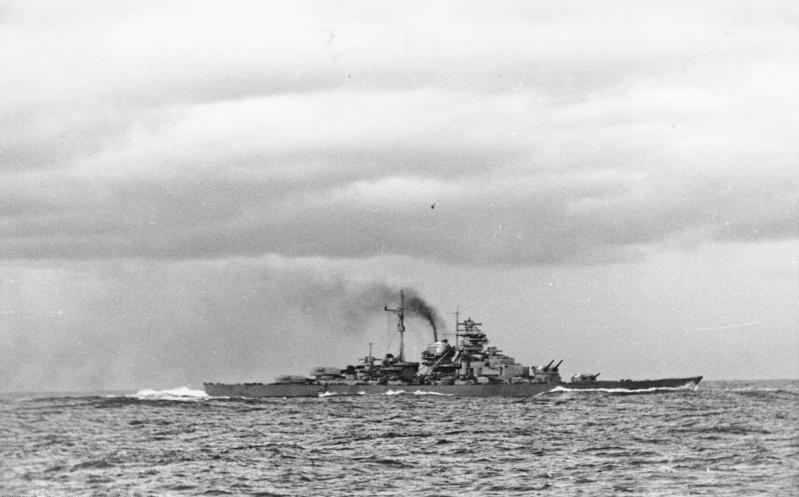
Bismarck as seen from Prinz Eugen after the Battle of the Denmark Strait

The German pre-dreadnought Schleswig-Holstein fired the first shots of World War II by initiating the bombardment of the Polish garrison at Westerplatte in the early hours on 1 September 1939. The German Scharnhorst-class battleships caught the British carrier HMS Glorious off the coast of Norway and sank her during the Norwegian campaign. Following the collapse of France in June 1940 and subsequent surrender, the British embarked on a campaign to neutralize or destroy French battleships that might be seized to reinforce the German fleet, including the attack on Mers-el-Kébir and the Battle of Dakar in July and September, respectively. In the former action, the British sank a pair of older Bretagne-class battleships and the fast battleship Dunkerque, though the latter was refloated and repaired. At Dakar, the French battleship Richelieu and other forces fended off the British task force, which resulted in the torpedoing of the battleship HMS Resolution, which was severely damaged.

Italy entered the war in June 1940, shortly before the French defeat. In November, the British launched a nighttime airstrike on the naval base at Taranto; in the Battle of Taranto, Fairey Swordfish torpedo bombers disabled three Italian battleships, though they were subsequently repaired. Over the next year, Italian and British battleships engaged in a number of inconclusive actions as they contested the supply lines to North Africa. These included the Battle of Cape Spartivento in November 1940 and the Battle of Cape Matapan in March 1941. At Matapan, the battleship Vittorio Veneto was badly damaged by a Swordfish, though the ship returned to port. The British battleships Valiant, Warspite, and Barham nevertheless caught a group of three heavy cruisers that evening and destroyed them in a furious, close-range night action. Convoy battles continued through 1941 and into 1942, with actions such as First and Second Sirte. By 1943, Italian operations were sharply reduced due to a shortage of fuel, and after the Allied invasion of Italy, the country surrendered, allowing most of its fleet to be interned at Malta. While on the way, the battleship Roma was sunk by a German Fritz X guided glide bomb.

In the meantime, in January 1941, the Germans began to send their few battleships on commerce raiding operations in the Atlantic, starting with the two Scharnhorst-class ships in Operation Berlin, which was not particularly successful. Bismarck followed with Operation Rheinübung in May, which resulted in two actions, the Battle of the Denmark Strait and the sinking of Bismarck. During the operation, Bismarck was crippled by Swordfish torpedo bombers, which allowed a pair of British battleships to catch and destroy her. By 1942, the last operational German battleships—Tirpitz and Scharnhorst—were sent to occupied Norway to serve as a fleet in being to tie down British naval resources and to attack supply convoys to the Soviet Union. The battleship HMS Duke of York eventually sank Scharnhorst at the Battle of North Cape in December 1943, and Tirpitz was destroyed by British heavy bombers in 1944.

=== Pacific theater ===
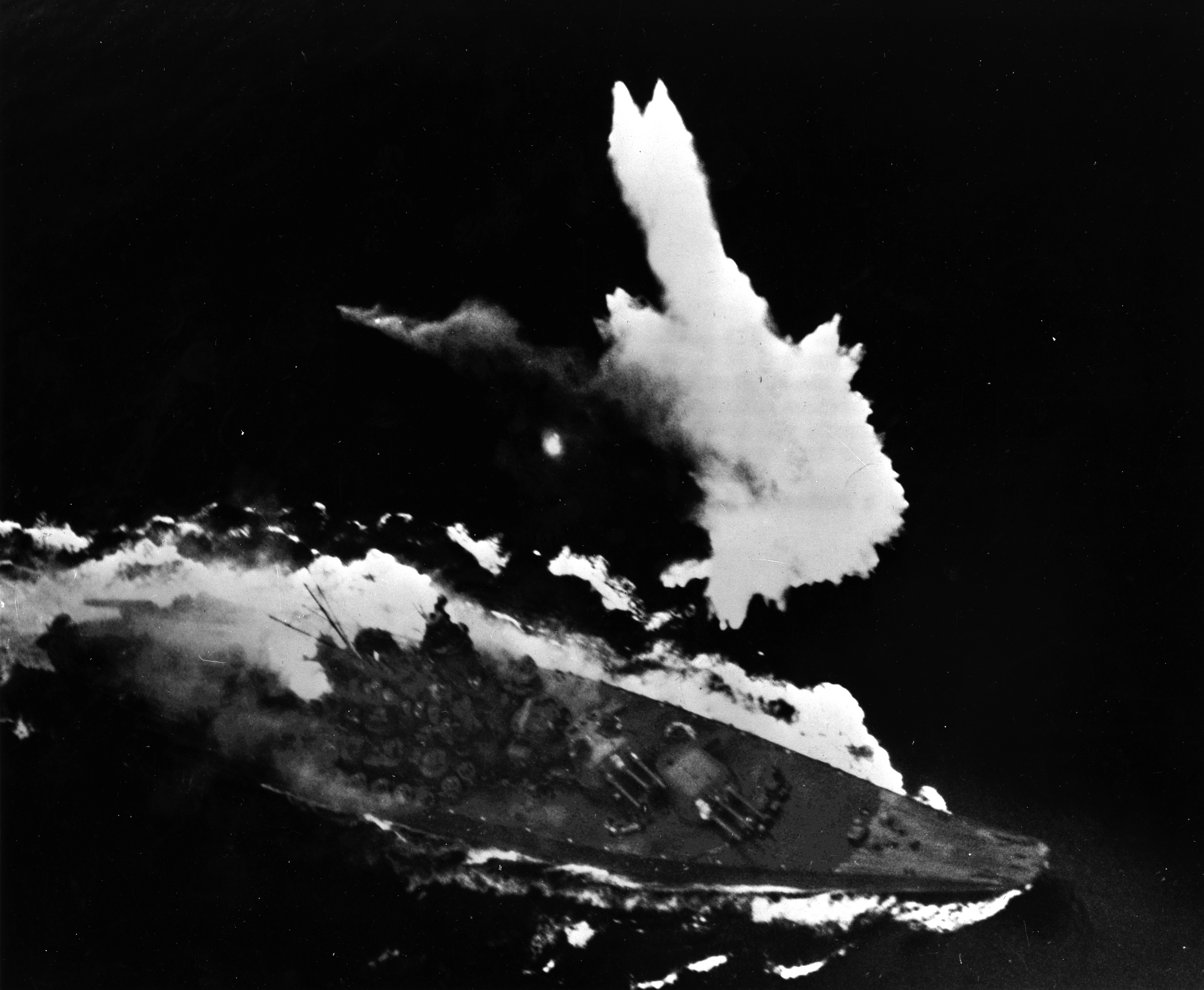
The Japanese battleship Yamato under heavy air attack and burning badly in April 1945

On 7 December 1941, the Japanese launched a surprise attack on the US naval base at Pearl Harbor. Over the course of two waves of dive-, level- and torpedo bombers, the Japanese sank or destroyed five battleships and inflicted serious damage to the facilities there. Three days later, land-based Japanese aircraft operating out of French Indochina, then occupied by Japan, caught and sank the British battleship HMS Prince of Wales and the battlecruiser HMS Repulse off the coast of British Malaya. Though the Taranto and Pearl Harbor strikes were significant steps toward aircraft replacing the battleship as the primary naval striking arm, the sinking of Prince of Wales and Repulse marked the first time aircraft had sunk capital ships that were maneuvering and returning fire. (Note: Though World War II ultimately saw this process come to fruition, the first two years of the war in Europe proved to be inconclusive; the attacks at Taranto and Pearl Harbor had only managed to sink battleships at anchor, providing limited resistance. Only the torpedoing of Bismarck by Ark Royal in 1941 had pointed toward the dominance of aircraft carriers, but Bismarck was only destroyed by British battleships.)

Employment of battleships during the Pacific War was limited by a number of factors. Japanese strategic doctrine, the Kantai Kessen, envisioned a decisive clash of battleships at the end of the war, and so kept most of their battleships in home waters, and only the four Kongōs were routinely detached to escort the aircraft carriers of the Kido Butai. For their part, the US kept its surviving pre-war battleships out of action primarily because they were too slow to keep up with the carriers. Later in the war, they were employed as coastal bombardment vessels. Nevertheless, American and Japanese battleships saw significant action during the Guadalcanal campaign in 1942, most notably at the Naval Battle of Guadalcanal in November. There, an American squadron centered on the battleships Washington and South Dakota intercepted and sank the battleship Kirishima, though South Dakota received significant damage in return. As more and more of the American fast battleships entered service from 1942 onward, they were frequently used as escorts for the fast carrier task force that was the US Navy's primary striking arm in its campaign across the central Pacific.

During the Philippines campaign, battleships played a central role during the Battle of Leyte Gulf in October 1944. The action was one of the largest naval battles in history, which took place over several days as three Japanese fleets attacked the Allied invasion fleet. The Japanese battleship Musashi, part of Center Force, was sunk by American carrier aircraft during the Battle of Sibuyan Sea on 24 October. During the Battle of Surigao Strait the following night, several US battleships that had been repaired from the attack on Pearl Harbor defeated the Japanese Southern Force that included a pair of battleships. Center Force attacked again on 25 October in the Battle off Samar, but was driven off by destroyers and aircraft from several escort carriers. During the Battle of Okinawa in April 1945, Japan sent Yamato as a final suicide mission to attack the landing beaches and attempt to stop the invasion of the island. American aircraft scored between nine and thirteen torpedo hits and six bomb hits on the ship and sank her. Haruna was sunk by US aircraft off Kure, Japan, in July. Only Nagato survived the war. The war ended with the Japanese surrender aboard the battleship USS Missouri in September 1945.

== Cold War: end of the battleship era ==
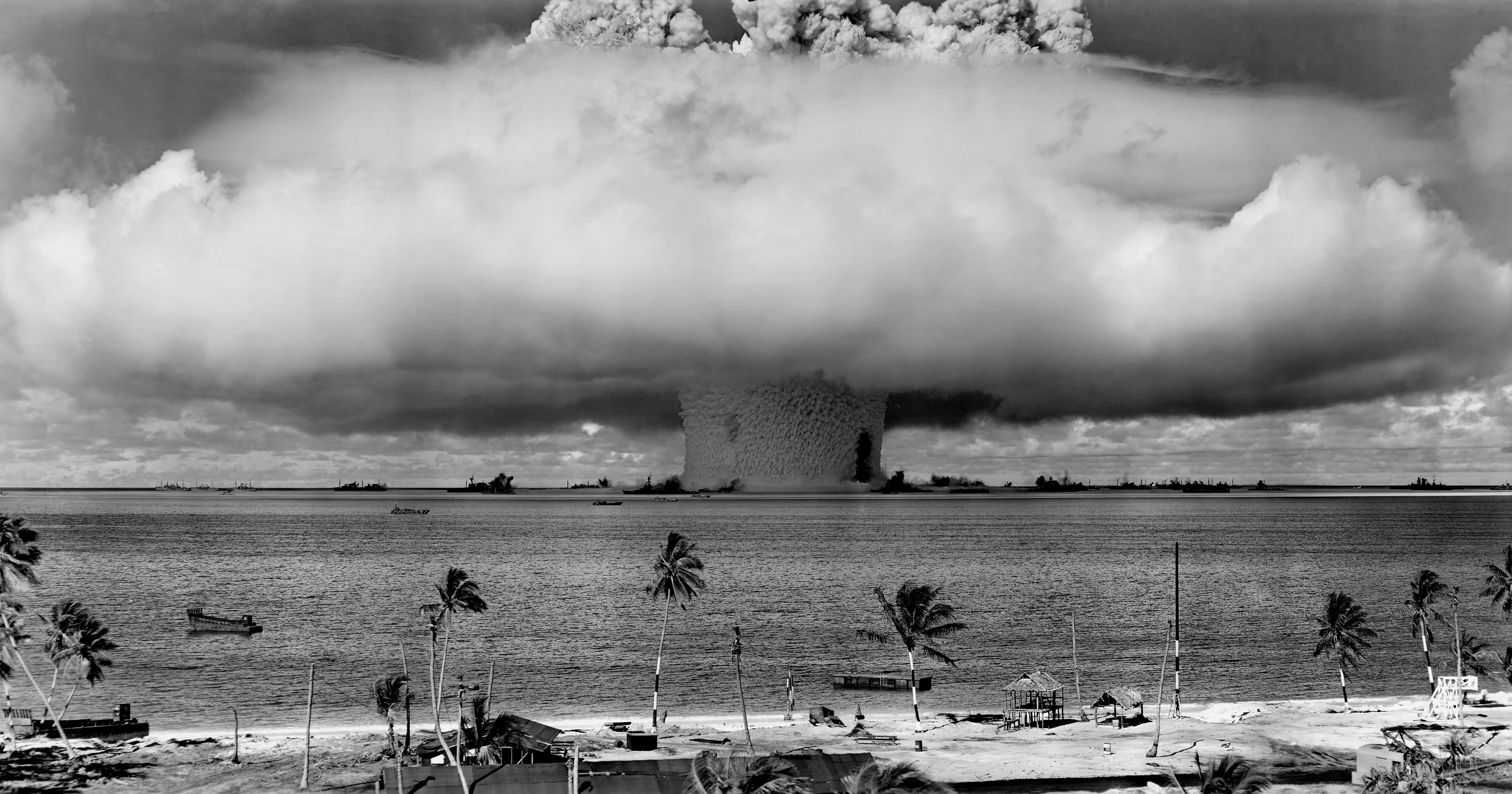
Operation Crossroads

After World War II, several navies retained their existing battleships, but most were either placed in their reserve fleets or scrapped outright. Of their surviving pre-war battleships, most of the American vessels were either scrapped or sunk as target ships by 1948, though the most modern vessels, those of the Tennessee and Maryland classes, survived until the late 1950s and early 1960s. One of the earlier vessels, USS Texas, was preserved as a museum ship. The four King George V-class ships were all broken up by 1957. Only two battleships—the British HMS Vanguard and the French Jean Bart—were completed after the war. Vanguard did not long outlast the King George Vs, being scrapped herself in 1960. Jean Bart (and her sister Richelieu) remained in the French fleet's inventory until the early 1960s, when they were discarded. Three of the six American North Carolina- and South Dakota-class ships were similarly scrapped in the early 1960s, but the other three—North Carolina, Massachusetts, and Alabama—were retained as museum ships. With the reduced naval budgets of the immediate postwar period, the US Navy chose to concentrate its resources on its carrier force. Besides the rise of aircraft carriers as the preeminent naval striking force, the advent of nuclear weapons influenced the decision to abandon large battleship fleets. In 1946, Nagato, which was seized by the US, and four American battleships were used during the Operation Crossroads nuclear weapons tests, though three of the American ships survived the two blasts and were later sunk with conventional weapons.

Of the remaining, smaller battleship fleets, Italy retained its two Andrea Doria-class battleships, of 1913 vintage, until the late 1950s and early 1960s, when they were scrapped. One other battleship, Giulio Cesare, was taken by the Soviets as reparations and renamed Novorossiysk; she was sunk by a mine in the Black Sea on 29 October 1955. The two surviving Littorio-class ships were taken by the US and UK as war reparations and scrapped in the late 1940s. The Soviets still had a pair of World War I-era battleships—Parizhskaya Kommuna and Gangut—but they, too, were scrapped in the late 1950s. The three large South American navies still had a handful of pre-World War I dreadnoughts in service after the war. Brazil eventually discarded its two Minas Gerais-class battleships in the early 1950s; Argentina sold its two Rivadavia-class battleships in 1956; the last ship in the region, the Chilean Almirante Latorre, followed them to the breakers' yard in 1959.

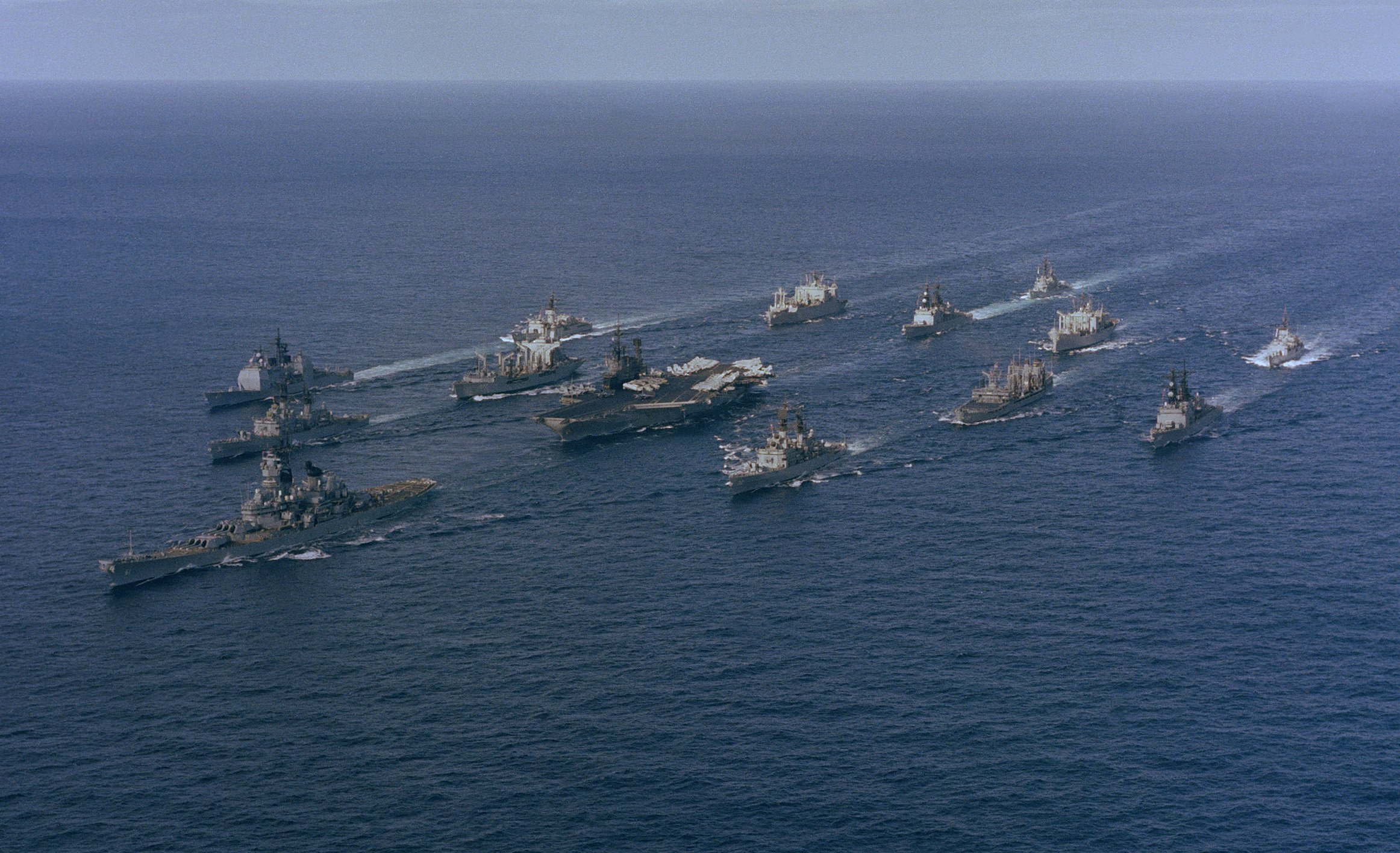
USN carrier group led by USS Iowa in 1987

The four Iowa-class battleships were the only vessels of the type to see significant combat after World War II. All four ships were reactivated for gunfire support duties during the Korean War in the early 1950s, and New Jersey was also deployed during the Vietnam War in 1968–1969 for the same task. All four ships were modernized in the early 1980s with Tomahawk cruise missiles, Harpoon anti-ship missiles, and Phalanx CIWS systems, along with the latest radar systems. They were recommissioned as part of the 600-ship Navy program under President Ronald Reagan. New Jersey next saw action in 1982, bombarding Syrian artillery during the Lebanese Civil War. Missouri and Wisconsin took part in Operation Desert Storm against Iraqi forces in 1991, bombarding enemy positions along the coast. The ships proved to be expensive to operate, and they required thousands of men to keep in service, so Iowa and New Jersey were already back in reserve by that time, and Missouri and Wisconsin were also decommissioned by the end of 1991. All four were struck from the Naval Vessel Register in 1995.

When the last Iowa-class ship was finally stricken from the Naval Vessel Registry, no battleships remained in service or in reserve with any navy worldwide. A number are preserved as museum ships, either afloat or in drydock. The US has eight battleships on display: Massachusetts, North Carolina, Alabama, Iowa, New Jersey, Missouri, Wisconsin, and Texas. Missouri and New Jersey are museums at Pearl Harbor and Camden, New Jersey, respectively. Iowa is on display as an educational attraction at the Los Angeles Waterfront in San Pedro, California. Wisconsin now serves as a museum ship in Norfolk, Virginia. Massachusetts, which has the distinction of never having lost a man during service, is on display at the Battleship Cove naval museum in Fall River, Massachusetts. Texas, the first battleship turned into a museum, is normally on display at the San Jacinto Battleground State Historic Site, near Houston; as of 2021, it is closed for repairs. North Carolina is on display in Wilmington, North Carolina. Alabama is on display in Mobile, Alabama. The USS Arizona Memorial was erected over the wreck of Arizona, which was sunk during the Pearl Harbor attack in 1941, to commemorate those killed in the raid. Memorials were also placed to mark the wreck of Utah, also sunk during the attack. The only other 20th-century battleship on display is the Japanese pre-dreadnought Mikasa, preserved since 1923.

On 22 December 2025, the U.S. Navy announced the planned construction of new battleships. The Trump class is to be the first nuclear-powered battleship, and it is planned to carry nuclear-capable cruise missiles and conventional weapons.

== Strategy and doctrine ==
=== Doctrine ===
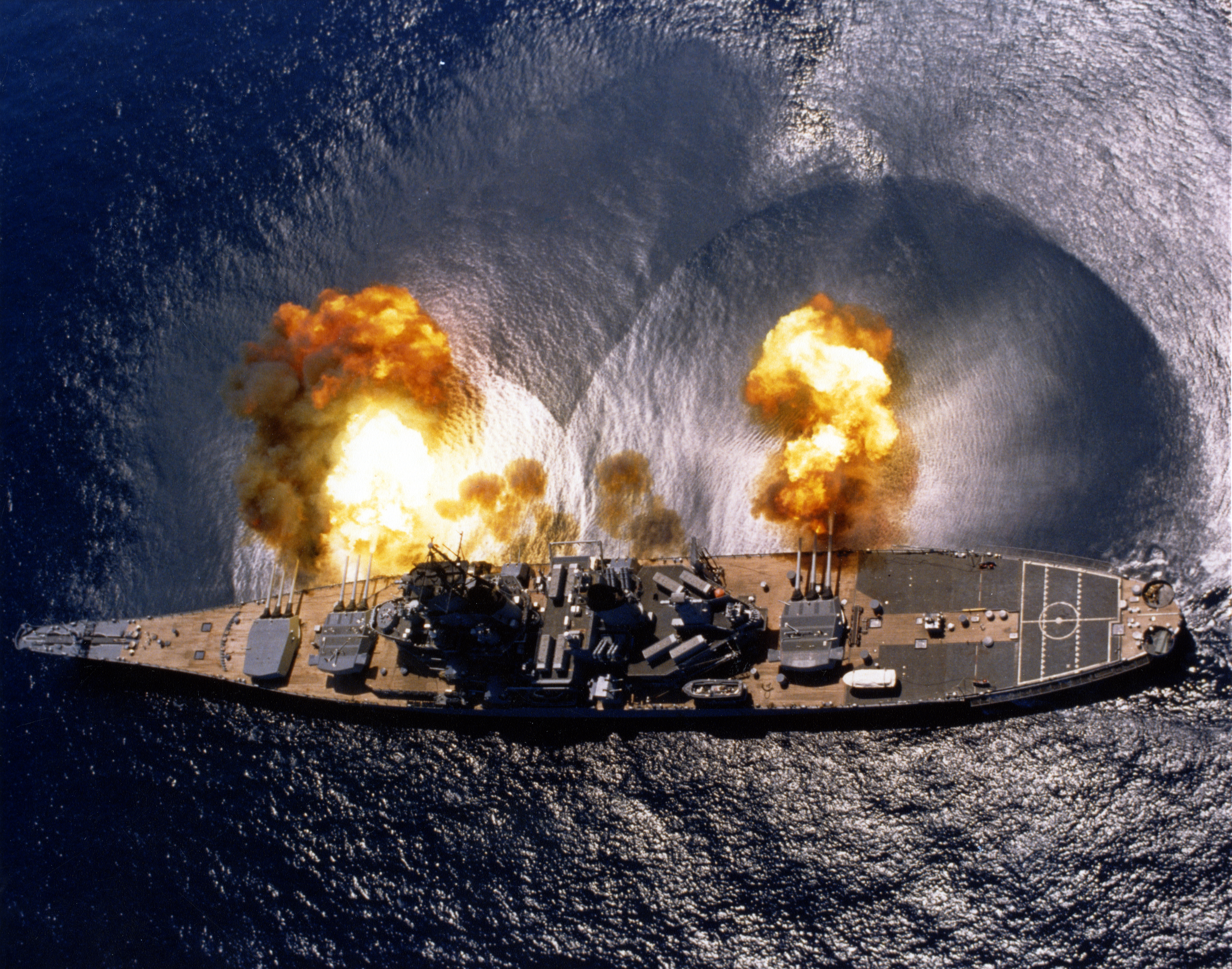
USS Iowa fires a full broadside of her nine 16-inch / 50 caliber and six 5-inch / 38 caliber guns during a target exercise.

For much of their existence, battleships were the embodiment of sea power. The American naval officer Alfred Thayer Mahan argued in his seminal 1890 work, The Influence of Sea Power upon History, that a strong navy was vital to the success of a nation, and control of the seas was a prerequisite for the projection of force. Conversely, countries with weak navies would inevitably decline. Mahan argued that the cruiser warfare advocated by the Jeune École could never be decisive, and that only fleets of battleships could control sea lanes and enforce blockades of an enemy's coast. The book proved to be widely influential across the world's navies; it was translated into German in 1896, where it was used to support the German naval expansion program championed by Alfred von Tirpitz. A Japanese-language translation also appeared in 1896, and it soon became required reading at the Japanese naval academy. By the end of the decade, Russian, French, Italian, and Spanish versions were produced.

A competing doctrine, that of the "fleet in being", dates at least as far back as the 17th-century Royal Navy; its commander, Lord Torrington, argued that his fleet, though significantly outnumbered by the French Navy of the day, posed enough of a risk as to dissuade a French attempt to invade England. The "fleet in being" in part acts as a deterrent against attack. The concept underpinned Tirpitz's so-called "risk theory" that was the basis of his program to build a German battle fleet. Even if the Royal Navy maintained a numerical superiority, the risk that the German fleet would inflict grievous damage even in the case of a British victory would militate against any such battle taking place, and Germany would be free to pursue its global ambitions.

=== Tactics ===
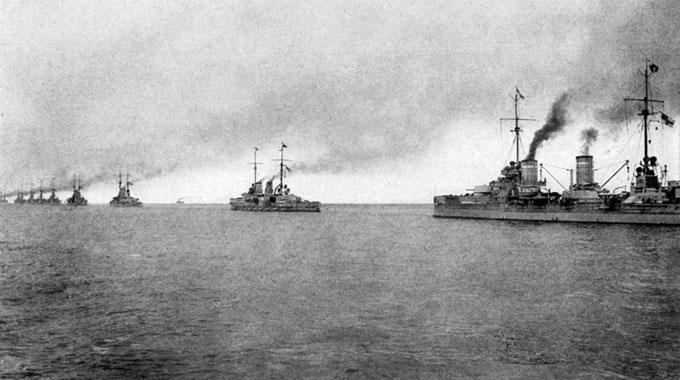
Dreadnoughts of the High Seas Fleet steaming in line ahead

By the 1890s, naval tacticians had developed a number of formations in which to employ battleships. The most prominent were referred to as "line ahead" and "line abreast". The former, the standard tactic during the Age of Sail, arrayed ships in a single-file line, which emphasized broadside fire. The latter placed ships side-by-side, which was suited to close-range melees where ramming and torpedoes could be effectively employed; after Tegetthoff's success at Lissa in 1866, which used a modified line abreast formation, the tactic enjoyed a period of popularity for several years. By the 1880s, line-ahead tactics had returned to prominence. Royal Navy officers devised the tactic referred to as "crossing the T" of an enemy fleet, whereby one fleet steaming in line-ahead formation crossed in front of another line of battleships. This maneuver would allow one's own battleships to concentrate entire broadsides on the leading enemy ship, while one's opponent could only reply with their forward guns. Many navies adopted the tactic soon thereafter.

As the threat of underwater attack, including mines and torpedoes, developed after the 1860s, capital ships could no longer maintain close blockades of enemy ports. This required smaller, faster scouts to observe hostile ports so that an enemy fleet could be brought to battle. Modern cruisers began to be built in the 1880s for this purpose. Almost immediately after the invention of the airplane, navies recognized its potential as a reconnaissance unit for the fleet's battleships.

The Austro-Hungarian Navy, then following the Jeune École doctrine of the 1870s and 1880s, devised the tactic of placing torpedo boats alongside battleships; these would hide behind the larger ships until gun-smoke obscured visibility enough for them to dart out and fire their torpedoes. While this tactic was made less effective by the development of smokeless propellant, the threat from more capable torpedo craft (later including submarines) remained. By the 1890s, the Royal Navy had developed the first destroyers, which were initially designed to intercept and drive off any attacking torpedo boats. The other major naval powers quickly followed suit with similar vessels of their own.

=== Psychological and diplomatic impact ===
The presence of battleships had a great psychological and diplomatic impact. Similar to possessing nuclear weapons in the second half of the 20th century, the ownership of battleships marked a country as a regional or global power, and the ability to build them domestically signified that a country could claim to be a great power. Even during the Cold War, the psychological impact of a battleship was significant. In September 1983, when Druze militia in Lebanon's Shouf Mountains fired upon US Marine peacekeepers, the arrival of USS New Jersey stopped the firing. Gunfire from New Jersey later killed militia leaders.

=== Cost-effectiveness ===
Battleships were the largest and most complex, and hence the most expensive warships of their time; as a result, the value of investment in battleships has always been contested. As the French politician Etienne Lamy wrote in 1879, "The construction of battleships is so costly, their effectiveness so uncertain and of such short duration, that the enterprise of creating an armored fleet seems to leave fruitless the perseverance of a people". The Jeune École school of thought of the 1870s and 1880s sought alternatives to the crippling expense and debatable utility of a conventional battlefleet. It proposed what would nowadays be termed a sea denial strategy, based on fast, long-ranged cruisers for commerce raiding and torpedo boat flotillas to attack enemy ships attempting to blockade French ports. The ideas of the Jeune École were ahead of their time; it was not until the 20th century that efficient mines, torpedoes, submarines, and aircraft were available that allowed similar ideas to be effectively implemented. The determination of powers such as Germany to build battlefleets with which to confront much stronger rivals has been criticized by historians, who emphasize the futility of investment in a battlefleet that has no chance of matching its opponent in an actual battle.

== Former operators ==
- Austro-Hungarian Navy: lost its entire navy following the collapse of the Empire at the end of World War I.
- Turkish Naval Forces: sole surviving battleship TCG Turgut Reis was scrapped in 1956.
- Spanish Navy: lost its two surviving España-class battleships during the Spanish Civil War, both in 1937.
- Royal Hellenic Navy: lost its two Mississippi-class battleships during the German bombing of Salamis in 1941.
- Kriegsmarine: its two surviving Deutschland-class battleships were scuttled or sunk in 1945, during the closing months of World War II.
- Imperial Japanese Navy: surrendered its sole surviving battleship, Nagato, to the United States following World War II.
- Brazilian Navy: sold its last battleship, Minas Geraes, for scrap in 1953.
- Italian Navy: decommissioned its Andrea Doria-class battleship in 1961.
- Soviet Navy: scrapped its last Gangut-class battleship in 1959.
- Argentine Navy: sold its last battleships, Rivadavia and Moreno, in 1956.
- Chilean Navy: sold its last battleship, Almirante Latorre, in 1959.
- Royal Navy: scrapped its last battleship, HMS Vanguard, in 1960.
- French Navy: scrapped its last battleship, Jean Bart, in 1970.
- United States Navy: decommissioned its last battleship, USS Missouri, in 1991.

== See also ==
- List of battleships
- List of battleships of World War I
- List of battleships of World War II
- List of sunken battleships
