= Russian ship Petropavlovsk =

Six ships of the Imperial Russian and Soviet Navies have been named Petropavlovsk after the 1854 Siege of Petropavlovsk.

- Russian ironclad Petropavlovsk - Steam frigate converted to an armored frigate while under construction
- Russian battleship Petropavlovsk (1894) - Petropavlovsk-class pre-dreadnought battleship sunk during the Russo-Japanese War of 1904–1905
- Russian battleship Petropavlovsk (1911) - Gangut-class battleship that participated in World War I and World War II before being scrapped in 1953
- Soviet cruiser Petropavlovsk (1940) - Admiral Hipper-class cruiser formerly named Lützow
- Soviet cruiser Petropavlovsk (1957) - Kirov-class cruiser formerly named Kaganovich
- Soviet cruiser Petropavlovsk (1973) - Kara-class cruiser commissioned in 1973 and scrapped in 1996

== See also ==
- Soviet cruiser Petropavlovsk
- Petropavlovsk (disambiguation)
