= Fleet in being =

Naval force that extends a controlling influence without ever leaving port

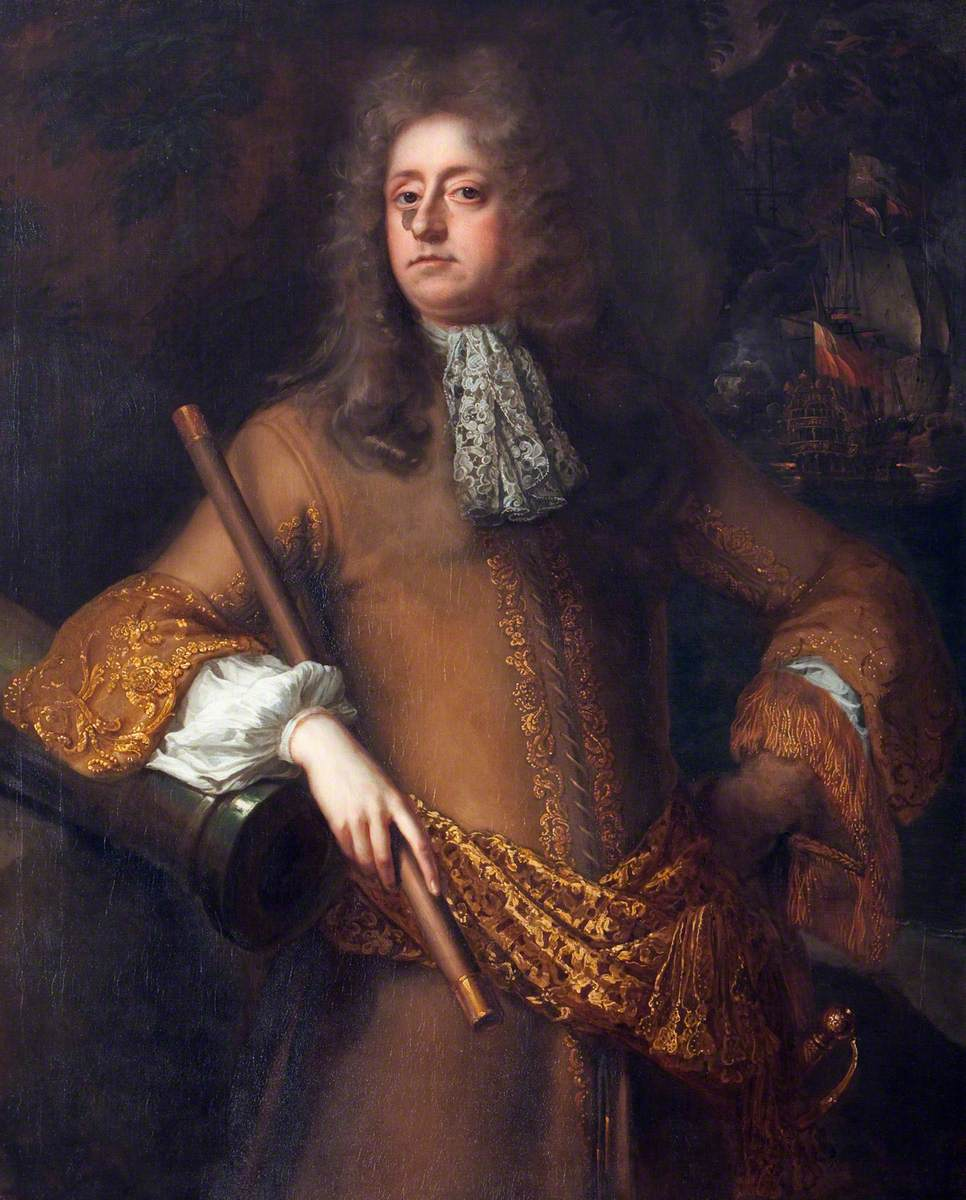
Arthur Herbert, 1st Earl of Torrington, who coined the concept of "fleet in being" in 1690

In naval warfare, a "fleet-in-being" is a naval force that extends a controlling influence without ever leaving port. Were the fleet to leave port and face the enemy, it might lose in battle and no longer influence the enemy's actions, but while it remains safely in port, the enemy is forced to continually deploy forces to guard against it potentially becoming an active participant. A "fleet in being" can be part of a sea denial doctrine, but not one of sea control.

== Use of the term ==
The term was first used in 1690 when Lord Torrington, commander of the Royal Navy forces in the English Channel, found himself facing a stronger French fleet. He proposed avoiding a sea battle, except under very favourable conditions, until he could be reinforced. By keeping his "fleet in being", he could maintain an active threat, which would force the enemy to remain in the area and prevent them from taking the initiative elsewhere.

=== Secondary use ===
Rudyard Kipling published a series of articles about the British Channel Fleet under the title A Fleet in Being: Notes of Three Trips with the Channel Squadron in 1898, but did not use the term in the sense described here.

== Concept ==
The "fleet in being" concept is based on the assumption that the fleet is relatively safe in port, even if near the enemy. While this is not necessarily true in the modern era, for much of human history a fleet at harbor was much less exposed to attack and to other hazards such as storms. This made it difficult, or even impossible, for an enemy to damage the fleet without taking disproportionate losses.

The enemy cannot simply ignore the fleet in being because it always has the option to sortie and attack wherever there are favourable terms. A blockading force has to be significant enough that the fleet in being cannot realistically attack it themselves. This creates a stalemate that favours the defender, because the attacker always must deploy a superior force to counter them, and those units are unable to perform any other duties.

After the Battle of Taranto and the attack on Pearl Harbor, it became obvious that air power made a fleet concentrated in a port vulnerable, and a fleet in being became too risky to be practical. A port is a known location for an enemy to focus attacks on and a handful of aircraft or submarines can damage or sink multiple warships, even in the presence of advanced defenses. Commando raids and drones present further potential risks for a fleet at port. As a result, it is preferable for modern fleets to be at sea where their position is not fully known, which provides a degree of protection. Undersea boats are even harder to track and spot when they operate submerged. The endurance of modern nuclear powered submarines is such that only the stores of provisions for the crew and psychological factors limit how long such vessels can remain at sea whether submerged or not.

This has not made a fleet in being completely irrelevant, because there are situations where an enemy is unwilling or unable to attack the fleet in harbour, such as for political reasons.

An example of this is during the Falklands War. After looking at the alternatives, "The strategy that was accepted for the Argentine Navy [in the 1982 Falklands War] was one of a 'fleet in being' concept ... The fleet would not conduct a direct attack; they would only attack when the odds were in their favor. Otherwise, they would remain outside any declared British exclusion zones and wait for a target of opportunity." The Argentines were not able to make any positive use of their "fleet in being", because the sinking of the ARA General Belgrano by HMS Conqueror showed that the World War II-era cruisers and other assets of the Argentine Navy were vulnerable to attack from contemporary submarines.

The idea of a "fleet in being" can be generalised to non-naval forces. A fortress under siege is essentially an "army in being", which ties up enemy forces without taking the risk of fighting a battle.

While less developed there are a few similar cases for air forces. During the Gulf War, Saddam Hussein used his air force with an operational doctrine analogous to "fleet in being". The mere presence of the Iraqi Air Force in hardened bunkers forced the coalition attacking Iraq to act cautiously and to escort its bomber sorties, until the aircraft shelters were found to be vulnerable.

In all cases the principle is the same. As long as a smaller force exists and has the choice to engage or not, the larger force is only able to conduct operations in sufficient strength to destroy the complete smaller force. This limits the enemy's options significantly, and may even deny actions entirely. The closer that the smaller force is to the larger in strength, the more significant the effect will be.

== History ==
=== Russo-Japanese War 1904–1905 ===
The first modern example was the stand-off between the Imperial Russian Navy and the Imperial Japanese Navy (IJN) at Port Arthur during the Russo-Japanese War in 1904. Russia possessed three battle-fleets: one in the Baltic Sea, the second in the Black Sea, and the third in the Far East. The Pacific squadron in the Far East was stationed at Vladivostok and Port Arthur. With the latter being closer to the land war, Port Arthur became strategically more important.

The IJN possessed one battle-fleet to the Russian Navy's three. Therefore it was imperative that the IJN not have to fight all three of them simultaneously. The Anglo-Japanese Treaty of 1902 effectively eliminated the Black Sea fleet, by keeping it blocked in the Black Sea, lest they risk war with Britain. The Baltic Fleet, later renamed the 2nd Pacific Squadron, had orders to reinforce the Port Arthur squadron sometime in 1905. It was the IJN's mission to preempt that move.

Only after Port Arthur's "fleet in being" was eliminated could the Baltic Fleet and Japanese fleet square off. This happened in the Battle of Tsushima in May 1905.

In order to permanently eliminate Port Arthur's battle-squadron, the IJN initiated three operations. The first was a surprise destroyer torpedo attack inside the harbor in early February 1904. This was quickly followed up with an attempt to block the harbor's entrance, by sinking old steam ships, as block ships in the channel. The third and final attempt of permanently bottling up the fleet was the mining of the waters surrounding the harbor's entrance. Although this last attempt also failed, it had the unintended consequence of robbing the Russian Navy of one of its most brilliant naval officers, Admiral Stepan Makarov. When his flagship, the battleship Petropavlovsk, struck one of the mines, she sank almost immediately, drowning Makarov with the crew.

The "fleet in being" remained so, until under the new command of Admiral Vilgelm Vitgeft. The Port Arthur squadron was ordered to break out and steam for Vladivostok on 10 August 1904. Vitgeft's exit from Port Arthur resulted in the Battle of the Yellow Sea, an excessively long-ranged gun duel that resulted in no capital warships being sunk on either side. It eliminated Port Arthur's "fleet in being", as its warships became dispersed to neutral ports, where they were interned, and the survivors were so heavily damaged that they were no longer serviceable.

=== World War I ===
A later example is the stand-off between the German High Seas Fleet and the British Grand Fleet during World War I. Germany largely preferred to keep its fleet intact, rather than taking the risk of losing a major engagement with the larger Royal Navy, particularly after the Battle of Jutland.

=== World War II ===
In World War II, actions of the Italian Regia Marina in 1940 also demonstrate the idea of a "fleet in being". After a number of minor battles against the Royal Navy that were mostly inconclusive, the bulk of the Italian fleet was left in Taranto, from where it could quickly sortie against any British attempt to reach Malta, exerting a "disproportionate influence on British strategy and fleet disposition". Even after the great tactical success of the British aircraft carrier attack on Taranto in November 1940, the British failure to deliver a decisive blow to the Italian fleet resulted in the Royal Navy tying up substantial naval forces in the Mediterranean for the next three years.

In Nazi Germany's Kriegsmarine (navy), the German battleship Tirpitz served her entire career as a "fleet in being". Although she never fired a shot at an enemy ship, her mere presence in the Norwegian fiords forced the Royal Navy and their allies to allocate powerful warships in defending Arctic convoys, and caused a major convoy (PQ 17) to scatter, suffering huge losses, mainly to U-boats and aircraft. A 1943 midget submarine attack and successive airstrikes launched by the RAF and the Fleet Air Arm removed the threat by November 1944, when the Tirpitz was sunk at Tromsø by Lancaster bombers.

== See also ==
- Command of the sea
- Red Sea Flotilla

== General and cited references ==
- Harper, Steven R. (17 June 1994). "Submarine Operations During the Falklands War (AD-A279 55)" (PDF). United States Naval War College. p. 12. Archived from the original on May 22, 2011.
- Hattendorf, John B. (Winter 2014). "The Idea of a 'Fleet in Being' in Historical Perspective". Naval War College Review. 67 (1). Article 6. JSTOR 26397437. Archived from the original on 9 July 2020.
- Mahan, Captain A. T. (June 1906). "Reflections, Historic and Other, Suggested by the Battle of the Japan Sea (Tsushima)". US Naval Institute Proceedings. XXXVI (2). US Naval Institute.
- Maltby, William S. (1994). "The Origins of a global strategy: England from 1558 to 1713". In Williamson Murray; et al. (eds.). The making of strategy: rulers, states, and war. Cambridge, England: Cambridge University Press. ISBN 978-0-521-56627-8.
- Tikowara, Hesibo (1907). Before Port Arthur in a Destroyer: The Personal Diary of a Japanese Naval Officer. Translated by Captain R. Grant (from the Spanish) (1st and 2nd ed.). London: John Murray. OCLC 31387560.
- Wennerholm, Colonel Bertil; Schyldt, Colonel Stig (23 May 2000). Kungliga Krigsvetenskapsakademien avd III. Swedish Royal War Academy. p. 13.
