= Soviet cruiser Petropavlovsk =

Three ships of the Soviet Navy have been named Petropavlovsk after the 1854 Siege of Petropavlovsk.

- Soviet cruiser Petropavlovsk (1940) - Admiral Hipper-class cruiser formerly named Lützow
- Soviet cruiser Petropavlovsk (1957) - Kirov-class cruiser formerly named Kaganovich
- Soviet cruiser Petropavlovsk (1973) - Kara-class cruiser commissioned in 1973 and scrapped in 1996

== See also ==
- Russian ship Petropavlovsk
- Petropavlovsk (disambiguation)
