= Sea denial =

Military term

Sea denial is a military term for preventing an enemy from using the sea. It is a naval warfare subset of anti-access/area denial (A2/AD) strategies, and does not necessarily mean that the denier itself will use the sea. It is a parallel concept to sea control, which implies that that controlling force cannot be successfully attacked.

Vego describes sea denial as "preventing partially or completely the enemy’s use of the sea for military and commercial purposes".

Corbett states that the object of sea denial is defensive. It is a less ambitious strategy than sea control and is often carried out by a weaker power. It is possible to pursue sea denial in one area of operation while pursuing sea control in another.

Sea denial can act as a direct complement to sea control. A nation may achieve sea control in its littorals, while enforcing sea denial outside the littorals, as was seen with the Soviet Union during periods of the Cold War.

== Methods ==
Sea denial is achieved in many different ways. The method depends on factors such as geography, ambition, and capabilities. Geographically it is easier to conduct sea denial operations in choke points such as narrow waters, straits, or congested waters.

Example techniques include naval mines, anti-ship missiles, drones, and submarines.

Barrier operations seek to hinder access to certain areas. Commerce raiding requires the enemy to put resources into escorting merchant ships. Asymmetrical warfare can involve attacking expensive ships with low cost uncrewed vessels. A fleet in being can threaten offensive operations without actually conducting them.

== History ==
During World War I and World War II, Germany pursued sea denial using U-boats. Owing to the substantial superiority of the Royal Navy's surface forces, Germany's Imperial Navy (in World War I) and Kriegsmarine (in World War II) had little hope of sea control, but with submarines, the Germans hoped to choke off their access to seaborne commerce. In both wars, the United Kingdom successfully resisted the German strategy with a combination of strict rationing and anti-submarine weapons and techniques.

During the Cold War, the Soviet Union invested heavily in submarines and would likely have pursued a similar strategy of sea denial had tensions with NATO escalated to open warfare.

Since World War II, the most notable example of sea denial involved the so-called 'Tanker War,' wherein Iran and Iraq sought to close the Persian Gulf.

Today the term A2/AD has gained traction, and refers to a sort of sea denial strategy where a state aspires to challenge access to certain areas while hindering freedom of movement in an adjacent area. It can include a combined effort of navy, air force, and army. The army deploys missiles and sensors. The air force deploys assets to gather intelligence, conduct surveillance and reconnaissance and target ships with airborne weaponry. The navy deploys sea mines, surface ships, and submarines in a layered defence and distributed lethality.

Modern sea denial addresses area denial weapons, for example in the context of a land power using land-based missiles to strike sea targets. Such missiles can follow cruise missile (terrain-skimming) or ballistic missile trajectories.

== See also ==
- Blockade
- Fleet in being
- Sea control or command of the sea ( same article )
- Commerce raiding

== Bibliography ==
- Corbett, Julian S. 2018. Some Principles of Maritime Strategy. Bd. 1911. Adansonia Press.
- Speller, Ian. 2019. Understanding Naval Warfare. 2. edition. Routledge.
- Till, Geoffrey. 2018. Seapower. A Guide for the Twenty-First Century. 4th edition. Cass Series: Naval Policy and History. 2 Park Square, Milton Park, Abdingdon Oxon, OX14 4RN: Routledge.
