= Command of the sea =

Complete control of naval warfare

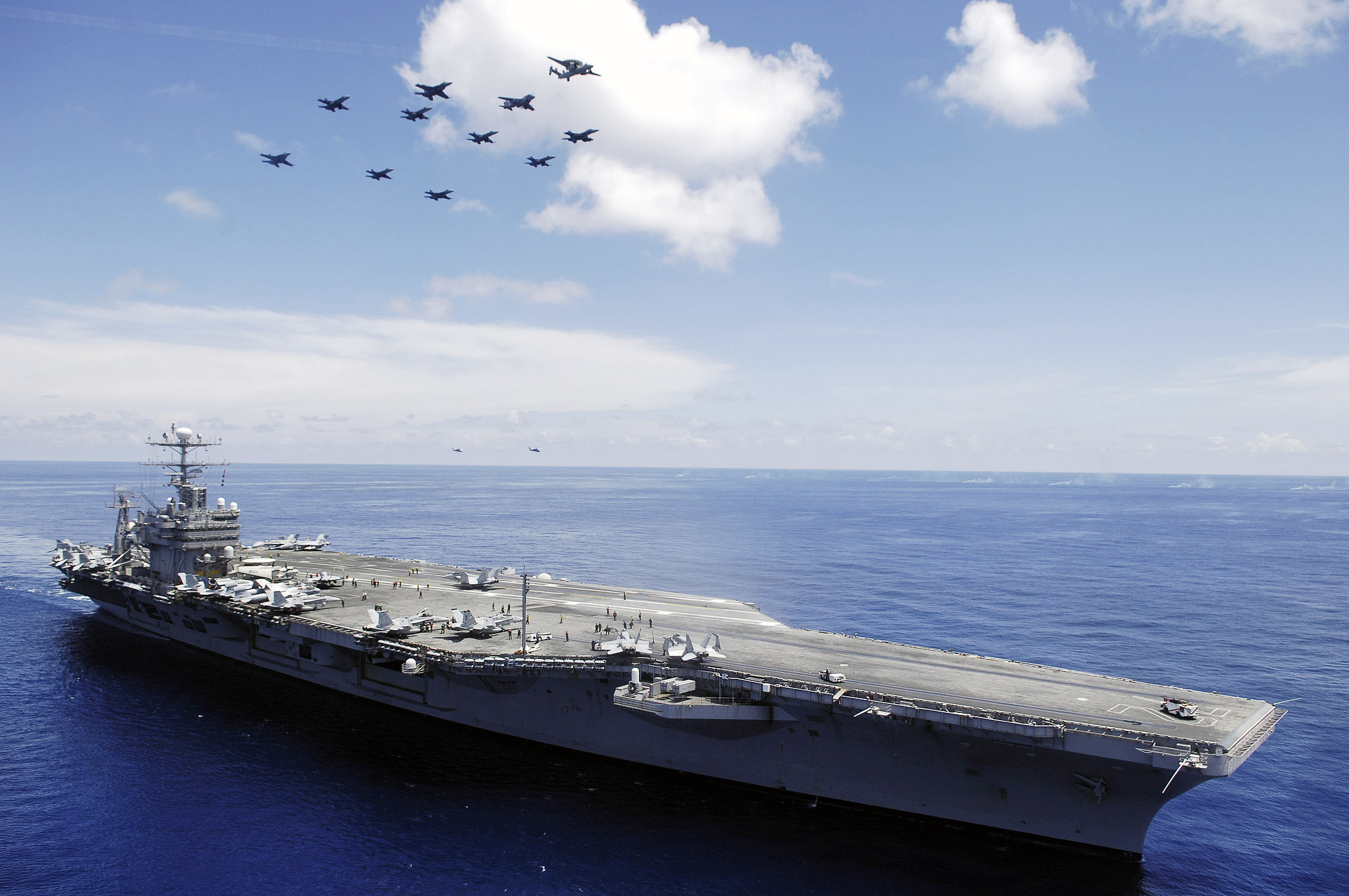
USS Abraham Lincoln, a United States Navy aircraft carrier, a means of global maritime power projection

Command of the sea (also called control of the sea or sea control) is a naval military concept regarding the strength of a particular navy to a specific naval area it controls. A navy has command of the sea when it is so strong that its rivals cannot attack it directly. This dominance may apply to its surrounding waters (i.e., the littoral) or may extend far into the oceans, meaning the country has a blue-water navy. It is the naval equivalent of air supremacy.

With command of the sea, a country (or alliance) can ensure that its own military and merchant ships can move around at will, while its rivals are forced either to stay in port or to try to evade it. It also enables free use of amphibious operations that can expand ground-based strategic options. The British Royal Navy held command of the sea for most of the period between the 18th to the early 20th centuries, allowing Britain and its allies to trade and to move troops and supplies easily in wartime, while its enemies could not. In the post-World War II period, the United States Navy has had command of the sea.

Few countries can operate blue-water navies, but many states are converting green-water navies to blue-water navies and this will increase military use of foreign exclusive economic zones (littoral zone to 200 nautical miles (370 km)) with possible repercussions for the EEZ regime.

== Historic command of the sea during the Age of Sail ==
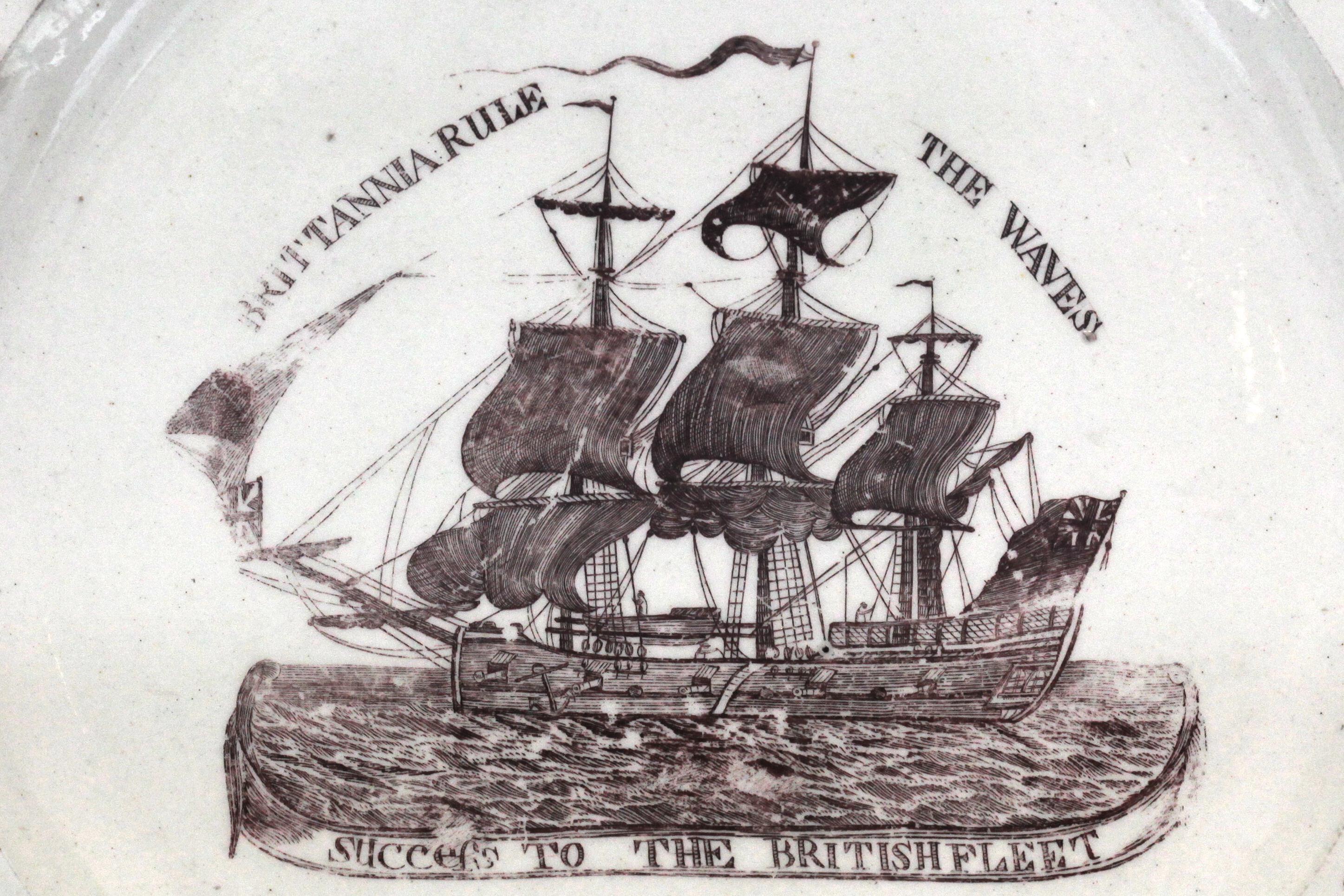
Britannia rule the waves: decorated plate made in Liverpool circa 1793-1794 (Musée de la Révolution française)

=== National capabilities ===
Historically, many powers attempted to extend command of the sea into peacetime, imposing taxes or other restrictions on shipping using areas of open sea. For example, Venice claimed the Adriatic Sea, and exacted a heavy toll from vessels navigating its northern waters. Genoa claimed significant control over the western Mediterranean. Denmark and Sweden claimed to share the Baltic Sea between them. Spain claimed dominion over the Pacific Ocean and the Gulf of Mexico, and Portugal over the Indian Ocean and all the Atlantic Ocean south of Morocco (Hall, 148-9).

=== Asymmetric countermeasures ===
During the Age of Sail, there were two primary counter measures to another power holding control of the sea: smuggling, and privateering. Smuggling helped to ensure that a country could continue trading (and obtaining food and other vital supplies) even when under blockade, while privateering allowed the weaker power to disrupt the stronger power's trade. As these measures, which are examples of asymmetric warfare, came from non-governmental and sometimes criminal organizations, they fell into disfavor with stronger governments. The 1856 Paris Declaration Respecting Maritime Law banned privateering. That treaty was ratified by relatively few countries, but has become the customary law of the sea.

== Historic command of the sea in the era of steam ==
A more modern countermeasure, similar to privateering, was the use of submarine warfare by Germany during World War I and World War II to attack allied merchant shipping primarily in the Atlantic Ocean, Mediterranean Sea, and Baltic Sea.

== Historic command of the sea in the era of naval aviation ==
During World War II, aircraft also became an effective countermeasure to command of the sea, since ships could not defend themselves well against air attack. The Battle of Britain was largely an attempt by Germany to eliminate the Royal Air Force, so that it would not be able to defend the Royal Navy from air attack and even to allow a maritime invasion of Great Britain proper. The entire Japanese naval strategy during World War II in the Pacific was to acquire command of the sea by largescale destruction of Allied naval power, until their fleet was either destroyed or rendered irrelevant by the Battle of Leyte Gulf giving command of the sea to the Allies.

== Modern command of the sea ==
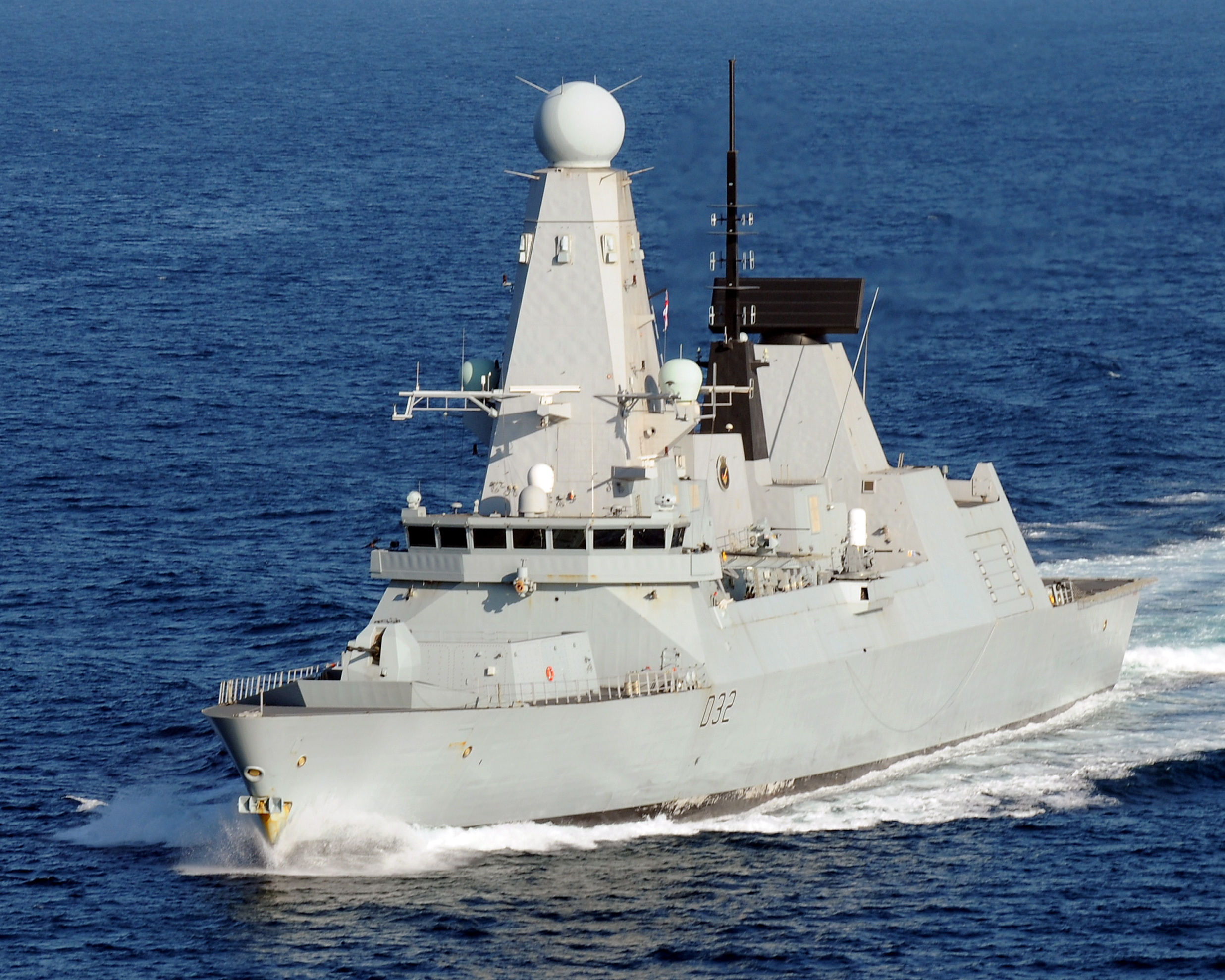
HMS Daring, a Royal Navy Type 45 guided missile destroyer

Advanced navies, with access to surveillance satellites and large-scale submarine detection systems, can rarely be surprised at sea, but cannot be everywhere. Individual ships of advanced navies can be vulnerable at sea (e.g., the USS Stark hit by an Iraqi aircraft-delivered anti-ship missile while patrolling the Persian Gulf) or in port (e.g., by the suicide attack on the USS Cole.)

"Blue-water" naval capability means that a fleet is able to operate on the "high seas." While traditionally a distinction was made between the coastal brown-water navy, operating in the littoral zone to 200 nautical miles (370 km), and a seagoing blue-water navy, a new term, "green-water navy," has been created by the U.S. Navy, which refers to the coastal submarines and fast attack boats of many nations, the larger littoral combat corvettes and similar vessels of a substantial number of powers, and amphibious vessels ranging from elderly LSTs to complex S/VTOL carriers and other specialized ships.

In modern warfare blue-water navy implies self-contained force protection from sub-surface, surface and airborne threats and a sustainable logistic reach, allowing a persistent presence at range. In some maritime environments such a defence is given by natural obstacles, such as the Arctic ice shelf.

The US Navy studied a concept for an economically priced ship capable of surface and subsurface sea control with ASW helicopters and STOVL fighters for light air defense but not large enough to be well suited to power projection known as a Sea Control Ship. This small aircraft carrier was not built by the US although a long deck Amphibious assault ship equipped with STOVL fighters and ASW helicopters instead of its primary transport helicopters is operating in a secondary sea control role.

=== Requirements for modern sea control ===
During the Falklands War, the British lacked long-range Airborne Warning and Control System (AWACS), which led to ship losses and major damage to others, when the Argentinian attack aircraft came into the view of ship radar at approximately the same time they would fire antiship missiles, and only a short time before they made bombing attacks. A number of navies have learned this lesson. Many navies with STOVL carriers have developed helicopter-mounted AWACS like the British and Spanish Westland Sea King AEW, Italian EH-101 AEW, and the Russian Ka-31 AEW helicopter. Recently the French with a new larger CATOBAR aircraft carrier obtained the US E-2 Hawkeye AWACS aircraft.

An example for the difference between a blue-water navy and a green-water navy: "...The first should be a 'green-water active defense' that would enable the People's Liberation Army Navy to protect China's territorial waters and enforce its sovereignty claims in the Taiwan Strait and the South China Sea. The second phase would be to develop a blue-water navy capable of projecting power into the western Pacific . . . Liu [commander in chief of the PLAN 1982-88 and vice chairman of the Central Military Commission 1989-97] believed that in order to fulfill a blue-water capability, the PLAN had to obtain aircraft carriers . . ." Aircraft carriers are deployed with other specialized vessels in carrier battle groups, providing protection against sub-surface, surface and airborne threats.

As there is no clear definition of a blue-water navy, the status is disputed. Given the importance of naval aviation, the term may be considered to be strongly linked to the maintenance of aircraft carriers capable of operating in the oceans. "In the early 80s there was a bitter and very public battle fought over whether or not to replace Australia's last aircraft carrier, HMAS Melbourne. Senior Royal Australian Navy personnel warned without a carrier, Australia would be vulnerable to all types of threat. One ex-Chief of Navy went so far as to claim that we" (the Australians) "would no longer have a blue-water navy (one capable of operating away from friendly coasts)." Yet although the Royal Thai Navy operates a sea-going carrier, the RTN is not absolutely a "blue-water navy."

=== Countermeasures to imposed command ===
While a blue-water navy can project sea control power into another nation's littoral, it remains susceptible to threats from less capable forces. Sustainment and logistics at range yield high costs and there may be a saturation advantage over a deployed force through the use of land-based air or surface-to-surface missile assets (whether on terrain-following or ballistic trajectories), diesel-electric submarines, or asymmetric tactics such as Fast Inshore Attack Craft. An example of this vulnerability was the October 2000 USS Cole bombing in Aden. In response to these threats, the U.S. Navy has developed the Littoral Combat Ship (LCS).

== See also ==
- Battleplan (documentary TV series)
- Air supremacy
- Naval blockade
- Sea denial
- Alfred Thayer Mahan
- Maritime republics
- Maritime power
- Thalassocracy
