= USS Florida (BB-30) =

Dreadnought battleship of the United States Navy

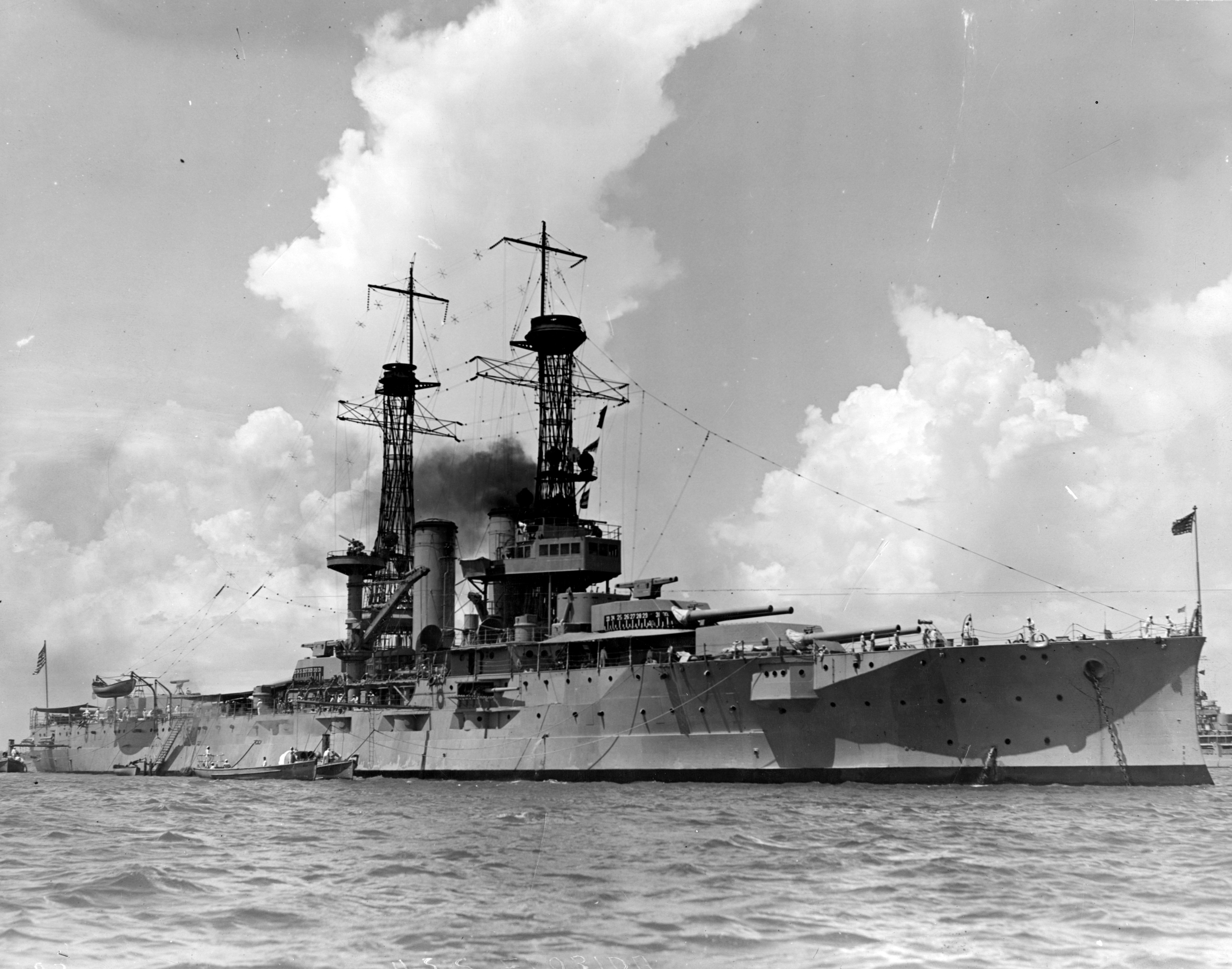
- Florida circa 1921

History

United States
- Name: Florida
- Namesake: Florida
- Ordered: 13 May 1908
- Builder: New York Naval Shipyard
- Laid down: 9 March 1909
- Launched: 12 May 1910
- Commissioned: 15 September 1911
- Decommissioned: 16 February 1931
- Stricken: 6 April 1931
- Fate: Sold 1931, broken up for scrap

General characteristics
- Class & type: Florida-class battleship
- Displacement: Normal: 21,825 long tons (22,175 t); Full load: 23,033 long tons (23,403 t)
- Length: 521 ft 6 in (159.0 m) (overall); 510 ft (155.4 m) (waterline)
- Beam: 88 ft 3 in (26.9 m)
- Draft: 28 ft 6 in (8.7 m) (mean); 30 ft 1 in (9.2 m) (max)
- Installed power: 12 × Babcock & Wilcox water-tube boilers; 28,000 shp (20,880 kW)
- Propulsion: 4 × Parsons steam turbines; 4 × screw propellers
- Speed: 21 kn (39 km/h; 24 mph)
- Capacity: Coal: 1,667 long tons (1,694 t) (standard); Coal: 2,520 long tons (2,560 t) (max); Oil: 400 long tons (406 t)
- Complement: 1,001 officers and men
- Armament: 10 × 12 in (305 mm)/45 caliber Mark 5 guns; 16 × 5 in (127 mm)/51 cal guns; 4 × 6-pounder 57 mm (2.24 in) guns; 2 × 1-pounder 37 mm (1.46 in) guns; 2 × 21 in (533 mm) torpedo tubes
- Armor: Belt: 9–11 in (229–279 mm); Lower casemate: 8–10 in (203–254 mm); Upper casemate: 5 in (127 mm); Barbettes: 4–10 in (102–254 mm); Turret face: 12 in (305 mm); Conning tower: 11.5 in (292 mm); Decks: 1.5 in (38 mm)

USS Florida (hull number BB-30) was the lead ship of the Florida class of dreadnought battleships of the United States Navy. She had one sister ship, Utah. Florida was laid down at the New York Navy Yard in March 1909, launched in May 1910, and commissioned into the US Navy in September 1911. She was armed with a main battery of ten 12-inch (305 mm) guns and was very similar in design to the preceding Delaware-class battleships.

Florida was one of the first ships to arrive during the United States occupation of Veracruz in early 1914, and part of her crew joined the landing party that occupied the city. She was assigned to United States Battleship Division 9 after the American entrance into World War I in April 1917; the division was sent to Europe to reinforce the British Grand Fleet. During the war, Florida and the rest of her unit, reassigned as the 6th Battle Squadron of the Grand Fleet, conducted patrols in the North Sea and escorted convoys to Norway. She saw no action against the German High Seas Fleet, however.

Florida returned to normal peacetime duties in 1919. She was heavily modernized in 1924–1926, including a complete overhaul of her propulsion system. She remained in service until 1930, when the London Naval Treaty was signed. Under the terms of the treaty, Florida and Utah were removed from active service. Therefore, Florida was decommissioned in 1931 and scrapped the next year in Philadelphia.

== Design ==
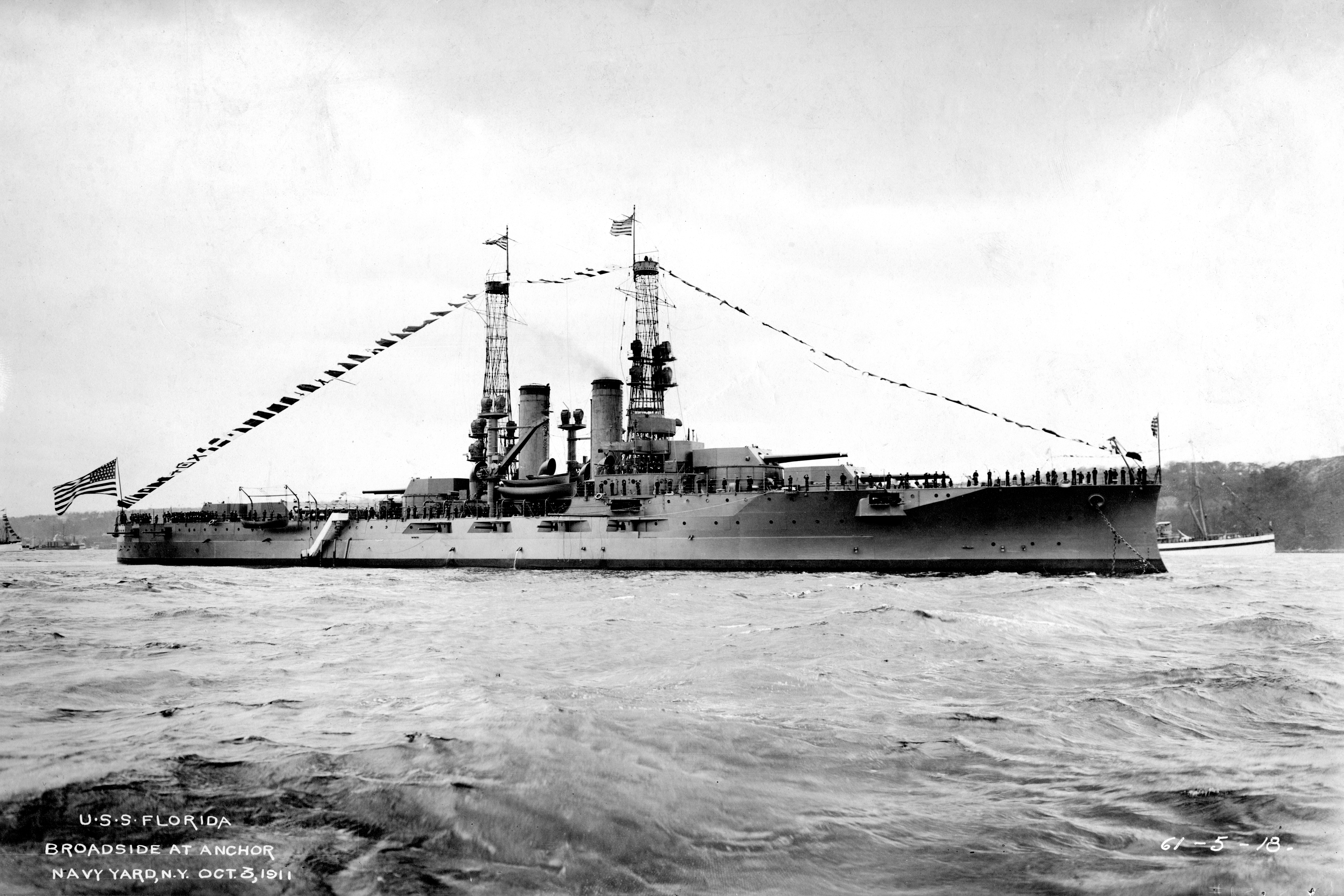
Florida in 1911 shortly after her completion

Florida was 521 ft 6 in (158.95 m) long overall and had a beam of 88 ft 3 in (26.90 m) and a draft of 28 ft 6 in (8.69 m). She displaced 21,825 long tons (22,175 t) as designed and up to 23,033 long tons (23,403 t) at full load. The ship was powered by four-shaft Parsons steam turbines rated at 28,000 shp (20,880 kW) and twelve coal-fired Babcock & Wilcox boilers, generating a top speed of 20.75 kn (38.43 km/h; 23.88 mph). The ship had a cruising range of 5,776 nmi (6,650 mi; 10,700 km) at a speed of 10 kn (19 km/h; 12 mph). She had a crew of 1,001 officers and men.

The ship was armed with a main battery of ten 12-inch (305 mm)/45 (Note: /50 refers to the length of the gun in terms of calibers. A /50 gun is 50 times long as it is in bore diameter.) caliber Mark 5 guns in five twin Mark 8 gun turrets on the centerline, two of which were placed in a superfiring pair forward. The other three turrets were placed aft of the superstructure. The secondary battery consisted of sixteen 5-inch (127 mm)/51 caliber guns mounted in casemates along the side of the hull. As was standard for capital ships of the period, she carried a pair of 21-inch (533 mm) torpedo tubes, submerged in her hull on the broadside.

Florida's main armored belt was 11 in (279 mm) thick, while the armored deck was 1.5 in (38 mm) thick. The gun turrets had 12 in (305 mm) thick faces and the conning tower had 11.5 in (292 mm) thick sides.

== Service history ==
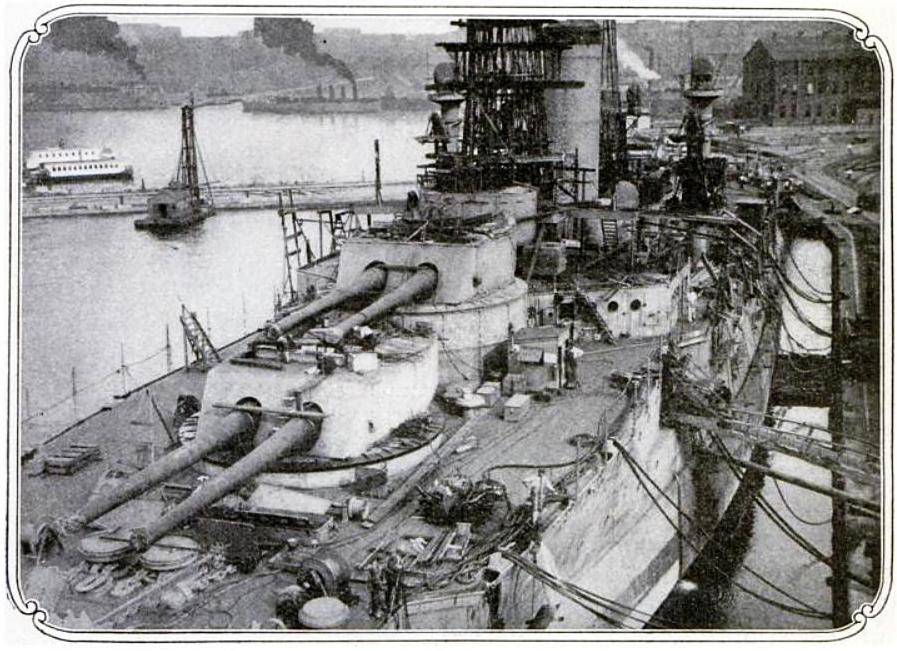
Florida during fitting-out work in 1911

Florida was laid down at the New York Navy Yard on 9 March 1909. She was launched on 12 May 1910, and commissioned into the US Navy on 15 September 1911. She spent the next several months on training cruises in the Caribbean and off Maine, after which she moved to Hampton Roads to join the Atlantic Fleet. She arrived on 29 March 1912, and was made the flagship of the 1st Battleship Division (BatDiv). For the next two years, she participated in the normal routine of peacetime exercises with her division and squadron and with the entire Atlantic Fleet. She also conducted extensive gunnery training and took midshipmen from the US Naval Academy on midshipman training cruises.

In early 1914 during the Mexican Revolution, the United States intervened in the fighting and occupied Veracruz. Florida and her sister Utah were the first capital ships to arrive in Veracruz, on 16 February. These two ships and Prairie landed a total contingent of over a thousand marines and bluejackets to begin the occupation of the city on 21 April. Over the next three days, the marines battled Mexican defenders in the city and suffered ninety-four casualties (19 dead), while killing hundreds of Mexicans in return. Twenty-five men from Florida's crew received the Medal of Honor for their actions during the battle. In July, Florida departed Mexican waters to return to normal fleet operations, and in October, she was reassigned to the 2nd Battleship Division.

=== World War I ===
On 6 April 1917, the United States declared war on Germany over its unrestricted submarine warfare campaign. Florida participated in wartime readiness exercises in 1917, before steaming across the Atlantic with Battleship Division 9. The division, which consisted of Florida, New York, Wyoming, and Delaware, left the United States on 25 November. The division was sent to European waters to reinforce the British Grand Fleet in the North Sea. After arriving in Scapa Flow, Battleship Division 9 became the 6th Battle Squadron of the Grand Fleet.

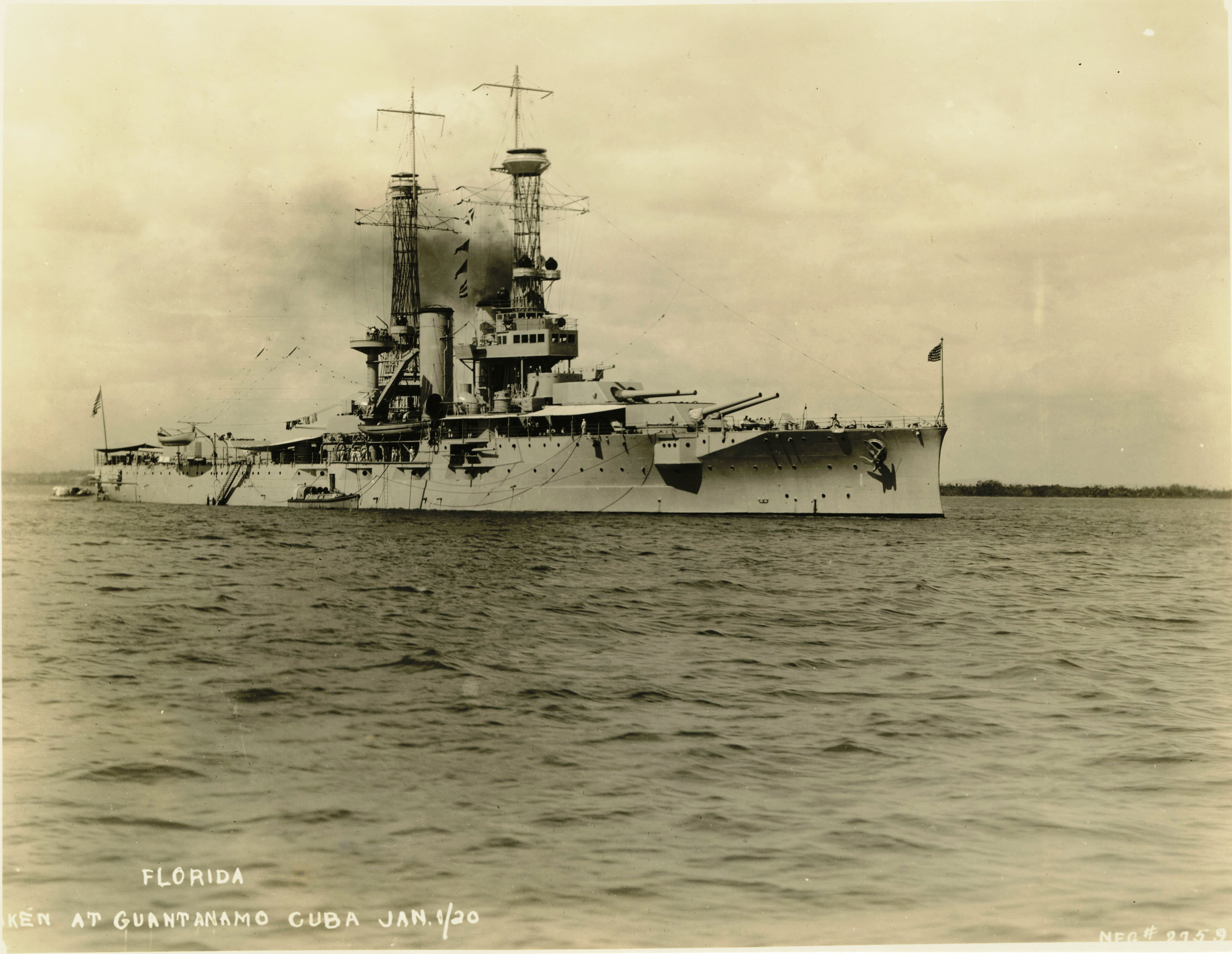
Florida in 1920

Starting in late 1917, the Germans had begun to use surface raiders to attack the British convoys to Scandinavia; this forced the British to send squadrons from the Grand Fleet to escort the convoys. On 6 February 1918, the 6th Battle Squadron and eight British destroyers escorted a convoy of merchant ships to Norway. While on the operation, Florida's lookouts reported spotting a U-boat, though the commander of Wyoming later argued that this and others issued by the rest of the squadron were false reports. (Note: According to German records, two U-boats, U-80 and U-82, were in the area, but never made contact with any Allied vessels.) The squadron was back in Scapa Flow on 10 February; Delaware escorted two more such convoys in March and April. During the March convoy, Florida, Wyoming, Texas, and four destroyers became separated from the convoy in heavy fog, and only relocated it the following morning when the fog had lifted. The squadron returned to Scapa Flow on 13 March.

On 22–24 April, the German High Seas Fleet sortied to intercept one of the convoys in the hope of cutting off and destroying the escorting battleship squadron. Florida and the rest of the Grand Fleet left Scapa Flow on 24 April in an attempt to intercept the Germans, but the High Seas Fleet had already broken off the operation and was on its way back to port. On 30 June, the 6th Squadron was cruising in the North Sea in support of a mine-laying operation; while on patrol, Florida and several other ships fired on what they incorrectly believed to be U-boat wakes. By early November, the Spanish Flu pandemic had spread to the Grand Fleet; Florida was the only ship of the American contingent not to be quarantined for the virus. On 20 November, Florida and the rest of the Grand Fleet rendezvoused with the High Seas Fleet, which was then interned in Scapa Flow, following the Armistice with Germany that ended the war. Shortly thereafter, Florida was replaced with the newly commissioned Nevada.

Florida then joined the passenger ship SS George Washington on 12 December, which was carrying President Woodrow Wilson on his way to France to participate in the peace negotiations. The ships arrived in Brest, France on 13 December, after which Florida returned to the United States. She was present during the Victory Naval Review in the North River in New York City at the end of December.

=== Inter-War Period ===
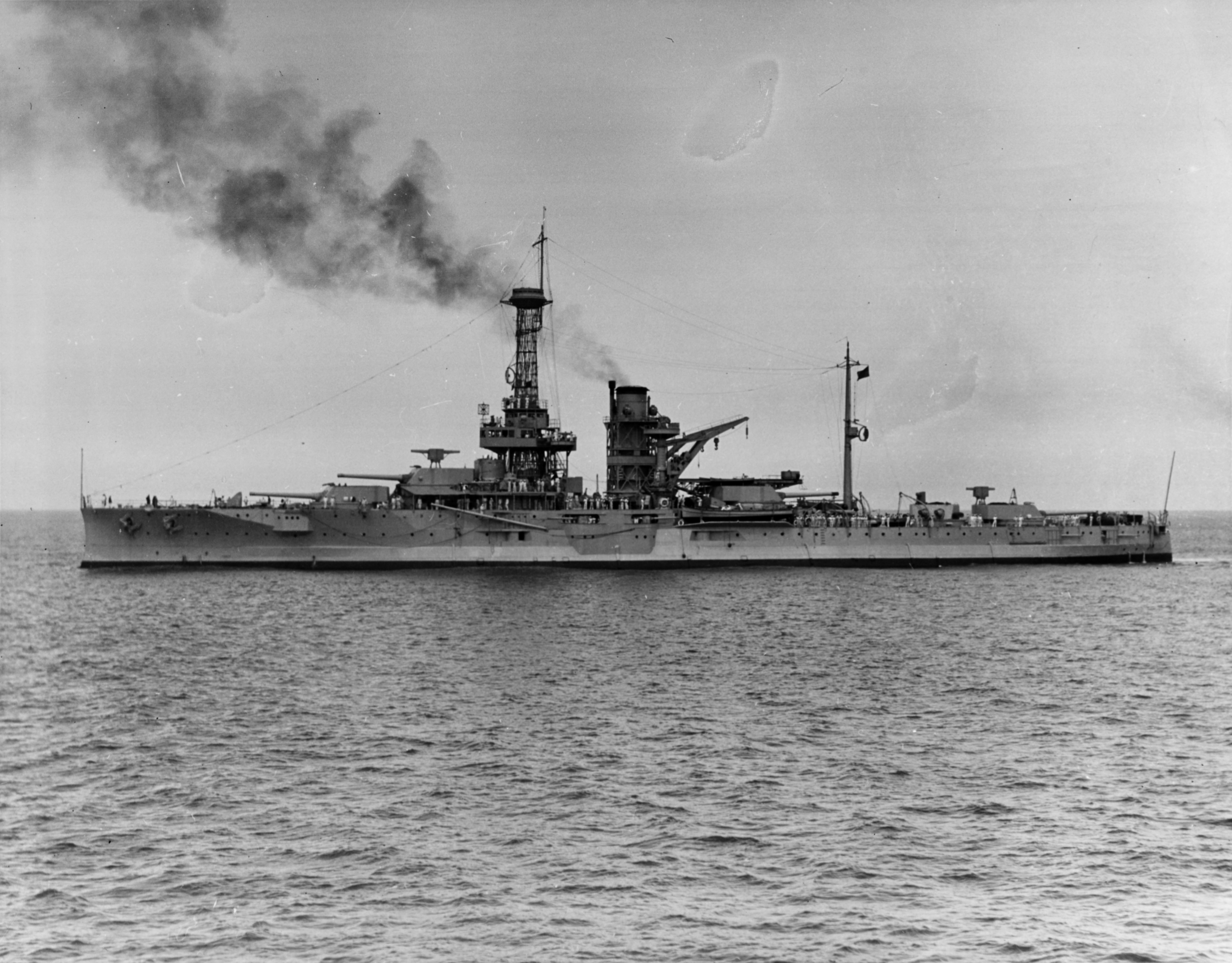
Florida in Hampton Roads in October 1929

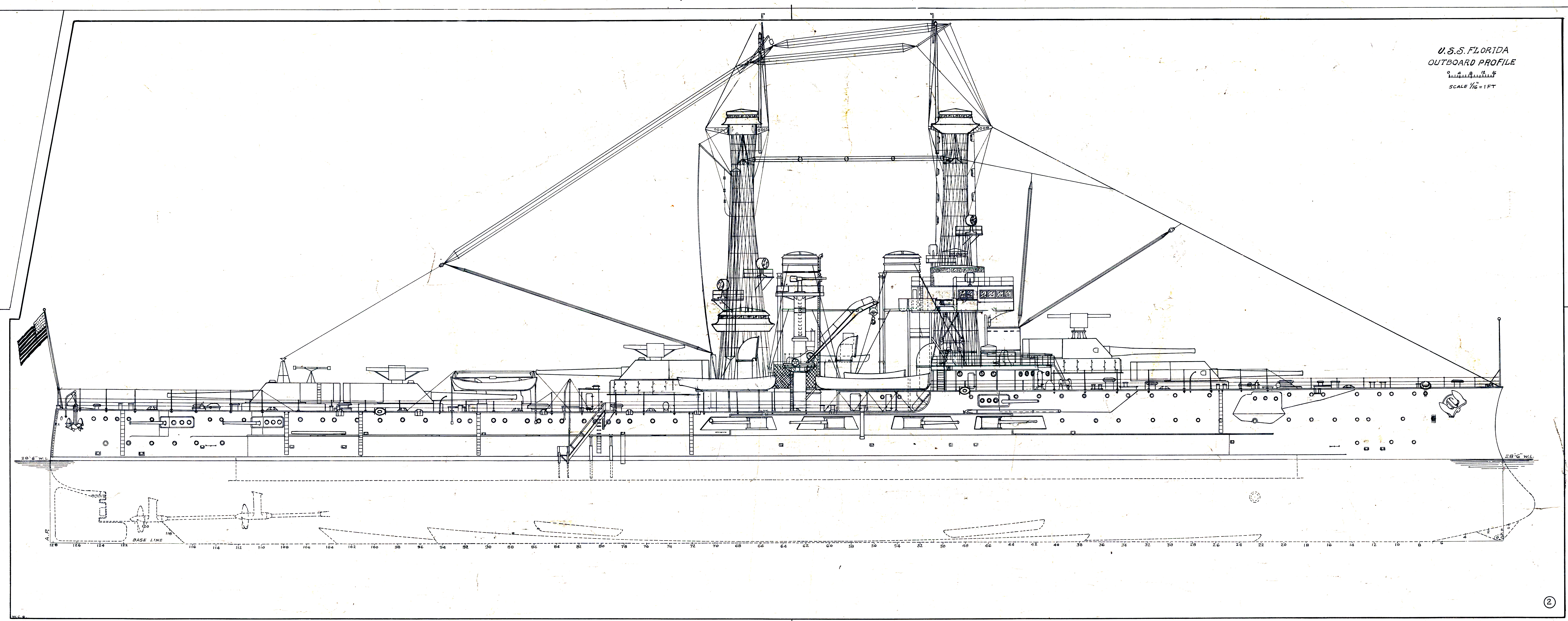
Florida profile updated to show ship configuration in 1923

Florida returned to normal peacetime duties in January 1919, when she arrived in Norfolk on the 4th. She steamed to the Azores to take weather observations for Navy seaplanes that were to make the first aerial crossing the Atlantic. In August 1920, Florida was present during the 300th anniversary of the Pilgrims' landing at Provincetown, Massachusetts. In December 1920, she made a good-will cruise to South America with US Secretary of State Bainbridge Colby aboard and over the next three years conducted amphibious operation training with the Marine Corps in the Caribbean. Florida also participated in the normal routine of exercises and midshipman cruises. During this period, she was made the flagship of the Commander, Control Force, US Fleet.

In early 1924, Florida took part in the Fleet Problem III maneuvers, where she and her sister Utah acted as stand-ins for the new Colorado-class battleships. In June 1924, Florida was taken out of service for a modernization at the Boston Navy Yard, which lasted from 1 April 1925 to 1 November 1926. During the reconstruction, her deck armor was strengthened and anti-torpedo blisters were installed to increase her resistance to underwater damage. Her secondary battery was rearranged to improve its efficiency, and four of her 5-inch guns, which were mounted in sponsons, were removed. She was also reboilered with four White-Forster oil-fired models that had been removed from the battleships and battlecruisers scrapped as a result of the Washington Naval Treaty. Her Parsons turbines were replaced with new Curtis geared turbines and her two funnels were trunked into one stack. The rear lattice mast was replaced with a pole mast, which was moved further aft. Her two submerged torpedo tubes were also removed.

Florida remained in service for a few years in her modernized form, and participated in joint Army-Navy coast defense exercises in June 1928. Under the terms of the London Naval Treaty of 1930, however, which reduced the battle fleets of the signatory countries, she was to be disposed of. She was decommissioned accordingly on 16 February 1931 at the Philadelphia Naval Yard, struck from the naval register on 6 April, and was broken up in Philadelphia later that year. Demolition work was completed by 30 September 1932. The one-ton ship's bell was saved and transported to the University of Florida in Gainesville, where it was first installed in a clock atop a classroom building. The clock was removed in the early 1950s and the bell was put in storage. In 1960, it was installed atop the stands in the north end zone at Florida Field, where it was traditionally rung by either cheerleaders or fans at the conclusion of a victory by the Florida Gator football team. As the stadium underwent successive expansions and renovations, the bell was moved to a location under the north end zone concourse and then was removed from the stadium in 1992. It has been restored and is now housed in the lobby of the Museum of Florida History.
