= USS Utah (BB-31) =

US Navy battleship sunk in 1941

Coordinates: 21.3690°N 157.9625°W

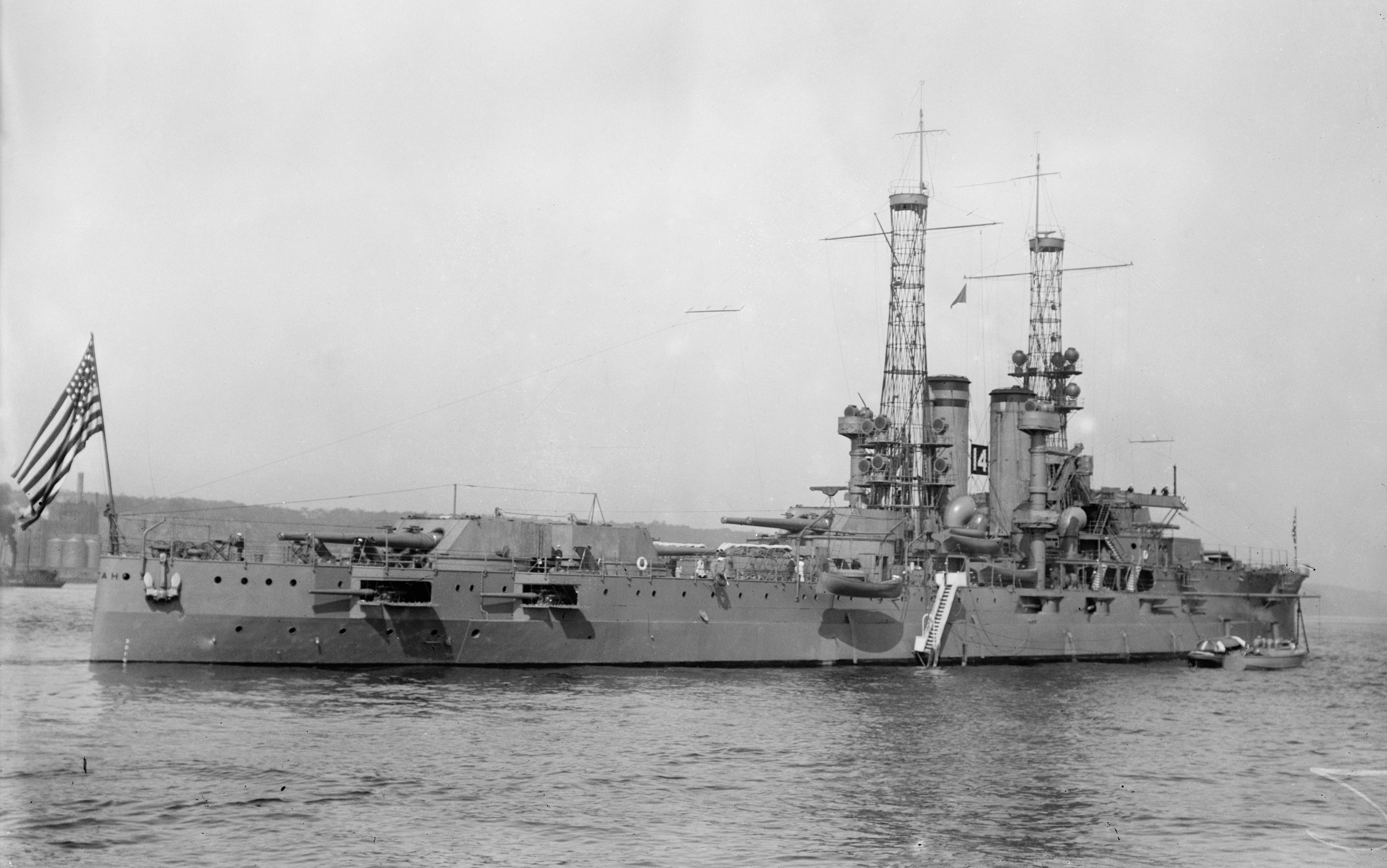
- Stern view of Utah (BB-31) in 1912

History

United States
- Name: Utah
- Namesake: Utah
- Builder: New York Shipbuilding Corporation
- Laid down: 9 March 1909
- Launched: 23 December 1909
- Commissioned: 31 August 1911
- Decommissioned: 5 September 1944
- Stricken: 13 November 1944
- Fate: Sunk at Pearl Harbor, 7 December 1941. Hull near Ford Island.

General characteristics
- Class & type: Florida-class battleship
- Displacement: Normal: 21,825 long tons (22,175 t); Full load: 23,033 long tons (23,403 t)
- Length: 521 ft 6 in (159.0 m) (overall); 510 ft (155.4 m) (waterline)
- Beam: 88 ft 3 in (26.9 m)
- Draft: 28 ft 6 in (8.7 m) (mean); 30 ft 1 in (9.2 m) (max)
- Installed power: 12 × Babcock & Wilcox water-tube boilers; 28,000 shp (20,880 kW)
- Propulsion: 4 × Parsons steam turbines; 4 × screw propellers
- Speed: 21 kn (39 km/h; 24 mph)
- Crew: 1,001 officers and men
- Armament: 10 × 12 in (305 mm)/45 caliber Mark 5 guns; 16 × 5 in (127 mm)/51 cal guns; 4 × 6-pounder 57 mm (2.24 in) guns; 2 × 1-pounder 37 mm (1.46 in) guns; 2 × 21 in (533 mm) torpedo tubes
- Armor: Belt: 9–11 in (229–279 mm); Barbettes: 4–10 in (102–254 mm); Turret face: 12 in (305 mm); Conning tower: 11.5 in (292 mm); Decks: 1.5 in (38 mm)
- Notes: 1 battle star awarded
- USS Utah wreck
- U.S. National Register of Historic Places
- U.S. National Historic Landmark
- Location: Joint Base Pearl Harbor–Hickam, Honolulu, Hawai'i
- Website: www.nps.gov/valr/index.htm
- NRHP reference No.: 89001084
- Added to NRHP: 5 May 1989

USS Utah (BB-31/AG-16) was the second of two Florida class dreadnought battleships. The first ship of the United States Navy named after the state of Utah, she had one sister ship, Florida. Utah was built by the New York Shipbuilding Corporation, laid down in March 1909 and launched in December of that year. She was completed in August 1911, and was armed with a main battery of ten 12-inch (305 mm) guns in five twin gun turrets.

Utah and Florida were the first ships to arrive during the United States occupation of Veracruz in 1914 during the Mexican Revolution. The two battleships sent ashore a landing party that began the occupation of the city. After the American entrance into World War I, Utah was stationed at Berehaven in Bantry Bay, Ireland, where she protected convoys from potential German surface raiders. Throughout the 1920s, the ship conducted numerous training cruises and fleet maneuvers, and carried dignitaries on tours of South America twice, in 1924 and 1928.

In 1931, Utah was demilitarized and converted into a target ship and re-designated as AG-16, in accordance with the terms of the London Naval Treaty signed the previous year. She was also equipped with numerous anti-aircraft guns of different types to train gunners for the fleet. She served in these two roles for the rest of the decade. She was in port at Pearl Harbor on the morning of 7 December 1941, and in the first minutes of the Japanese attack, was hit by two torpedoes, which caused serious flooding. Utah quickly rolled over and sank; 58 men were killed, while 461 of her crew were able to escape. The wreck remains in the harbor, and in 1972, a memorial was erected near the ship.

== Design ==
Utah was 521 ft 6 in (158.95 m) long overall and had a beam of 88 ft 3 in (26.90 m) and a draft of 28 ft 6 in (8.69 m). She displaced 21,825 long tons (22,175 t) as designed and up to 23,033 long tons (23,403 t) at full load. The ship was powered by four-shaft Parsons steam turbines rated at 28,000 shp (20,880 kW) and twelve coal-fired Babcock & Wilcox boilers, generating a top speed of 20.75 kn (38.43 km/h; 23.88 mph). The ship had a cruising range of 5,776 nmi (6,650 mi; 10,700 km) at a speed of 10 kn (19 km/h; 12 mph). She had a crew of 1,001 officers and men.

The ship was armed with a main battery of ten 12-inch/45 (Note: /45 refers to the length of the gun in terms of calibers. A /45 gun is 45 times as long as it is in bore diameter.) Mark 5 guns in five twin gun turrets on the centerline, two of which were placed in a superfiring pair forward. The other three turrets were placed aft of the superstructure. The secondary battery consisted of sixteen 5-inch (127 mm)/51 guns mounted in casemates along the side of the hull. As was standard for capital ships of the period, she carried a pair of 21-inch (533 mm) torpedo tubes, submerged in her hull on the broadside. The main armored belt was 11 in (279 mm) thick, while the armored deck was 1.5 in (38 mm) thick. The gun turrets had 12 in (305 mm) thick faces and the conning tower had 11.5 in (292 mm) thick sides.

== Service history ==
=== Construction – 1922 ===
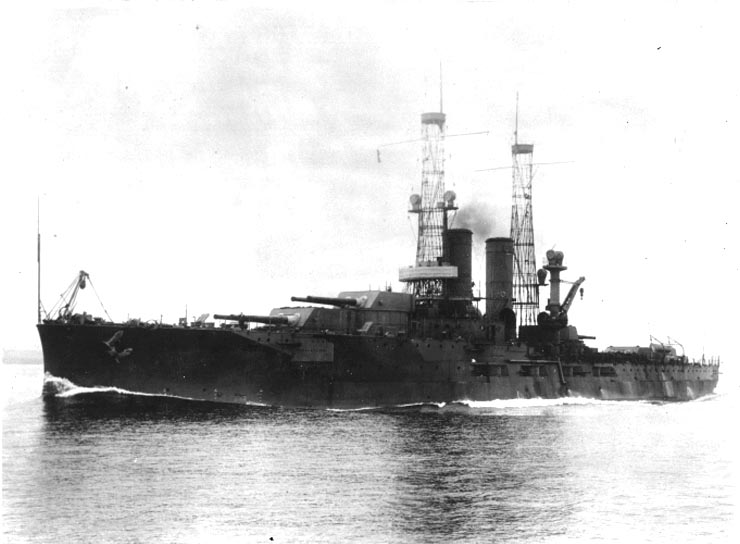
Utah, c. 1911

Utah was laid down at the New York Shipbuilding Corporation on 15 March 1909. She was launched on 23 December 1909 and was commissioned into the United States Navy on 31 August 1911. She then conducted a shakedown cruise that stopped in Hampton Roads, Santa Rosa Island, Pensacola, Galveston, Kingston, Jamaica, and Guantánamo Bay, Cuba. She was then assigned to the Atlantic Fleet in March 1912, after which time she participated in gunnery drills. She underwent an overhaul at the New York Navy Yard starting on 16 April. Utah left New York on 1 June and proceeded to Annapolis by way of Hampton Roads, arriving on 6 June. From there, she took a crew of naval cadets from the Naval Academy on a midshipman training cruise off the coast of New England, which lasted until 25 August.

For the next two years, Utah followed a similar routine of training exercises and midshipman cruises in the Atlantic. During the period 8–30 November 1913, Utah made a goodwill cruise to European waters, which included a stop in Villefranche, France. In early 1914 during the Mexican Revolution, the United States decided to intervene in the fighting. While en route to Mexico on 16 April, Utah was ordered to intercept the German-flagged steamer SS Ypiranga, which was carrying arms to the Mexican dictator Victoriano Huerta. Ypiranga's arrival in Veracruz prompted the US to occupy the city; Utah and her sister ship Florida were the first American vessels on the scene. The two ships landed a combined contingent of a thousand Marines and Bluejackets to begin the occupation of the city on 21 April. Over the next three days, the Marines battled rebels in the city and suffered 94 casualties, while killing hundreds of Mexicans in return.

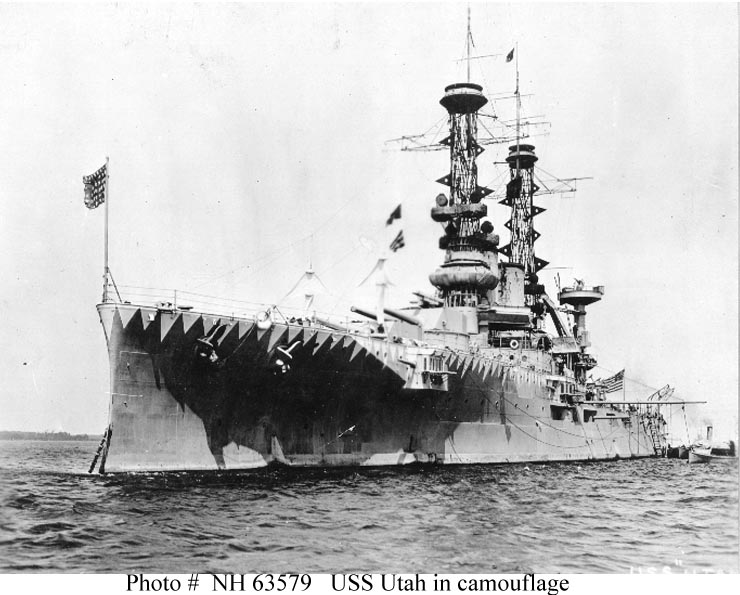
Utah during World War I wearing dazzle camouflage

Utah remained off Veracruz for two months, before she returned to the New York Navy Yard for an overhaul in late June. She spent the next three years conducting the normal routine of training with the Atlantic Fleet. On 6 April 1917, the United States entered World War I, declaring war on Germany over its unrestricted submarine warfare campaign against Britain. Utah was stationed in Chesapeake Bay to train engine room personnel and gunners for the rapidly expanding fleet until 30 August 1918, when she departed for Bantry Bay, Ireland with Vice Admiral Henry T. Mayo, Commander-in-Chief of the Atlantic Fleet aboard. After arriving in Ireland, Utah was assigned as the flagship of Battleship Division 6 (BatDiv 6), commanded by Rear Admiral Thomas S. Rodgers. BatDiv 6 was tasked with covering convoys in the Western Approaches against possible attacks from German surface raiders. Utah served in the division along with Nevada and Oklahoma.

Following the end of the war in November 1918, Utah visited the Isle of Portland in Britain, and escorted the liner George Washington in December, which carried President Woodrow Wilson to Brest, France, for the post-war peace negotiations at Versailles. Utah left Brest on 14 December, and arrived in New York on the 25th of the month. She remained there until 30 January 1919, after which time she returned to the normal peacetime routine of fleet exercises and training cruises. On 9 July 1921, Utah departed for Europe, stopping in Lisbon, Portugal, and Cherbourg, France. After arriving, she became the flagship of American warships in Europe. She carried on in this role until she was relieved by the armored cruiser USS Pittsburgh in October 1922.

=== 1922–1941 ===
Utah returned to the US on 21 October, where she returned to her old post as the flagship of BatDiv 6. In early 1924, Utah took part in the Fleet Problem III maneuvers, where she and her sister Florida acted as stand-ins for the new Colorado-class battleships. Later that year, Utah was chosen to carry the US diplomatic mission to the 9 December centennial celebration of the Battle of Ayacucho, which had taken place on that date in 1824. She left New York on 22 November with General of the Armies John J. Pershing aboard for a goodwill tour of South America; Utah arrived at Callao, Peru, on 9 December. At the conclusion of Pershing's tour, Utah met him at Montevideo, Uruguay, and then carried him to other ports, including Rio de Janeiro, Brazil, La Guaira, Venezuela, and Havana, Cuba. The tour ultimately ended when Utah returned Pershing to New York on 13 March 1925. Utah conducted midshipman training cruises over the summer of 1925. She was decommissioned at the Boston Navy Yard on 31 October 1925, and placed in drydock for modernization. The modernization replaced her coal-fired boilers with new oil-fired models, and her aft cage mast was replaced with a pole mast. She was reboilered with four White-Forster oil-fired models that had been removed from the battleships and battlecruisers scrapped as a result of the Washington Naval Treaty. Utah also had a catapult mounted on her Number 3 turret along with cranes for handling floatplanes.

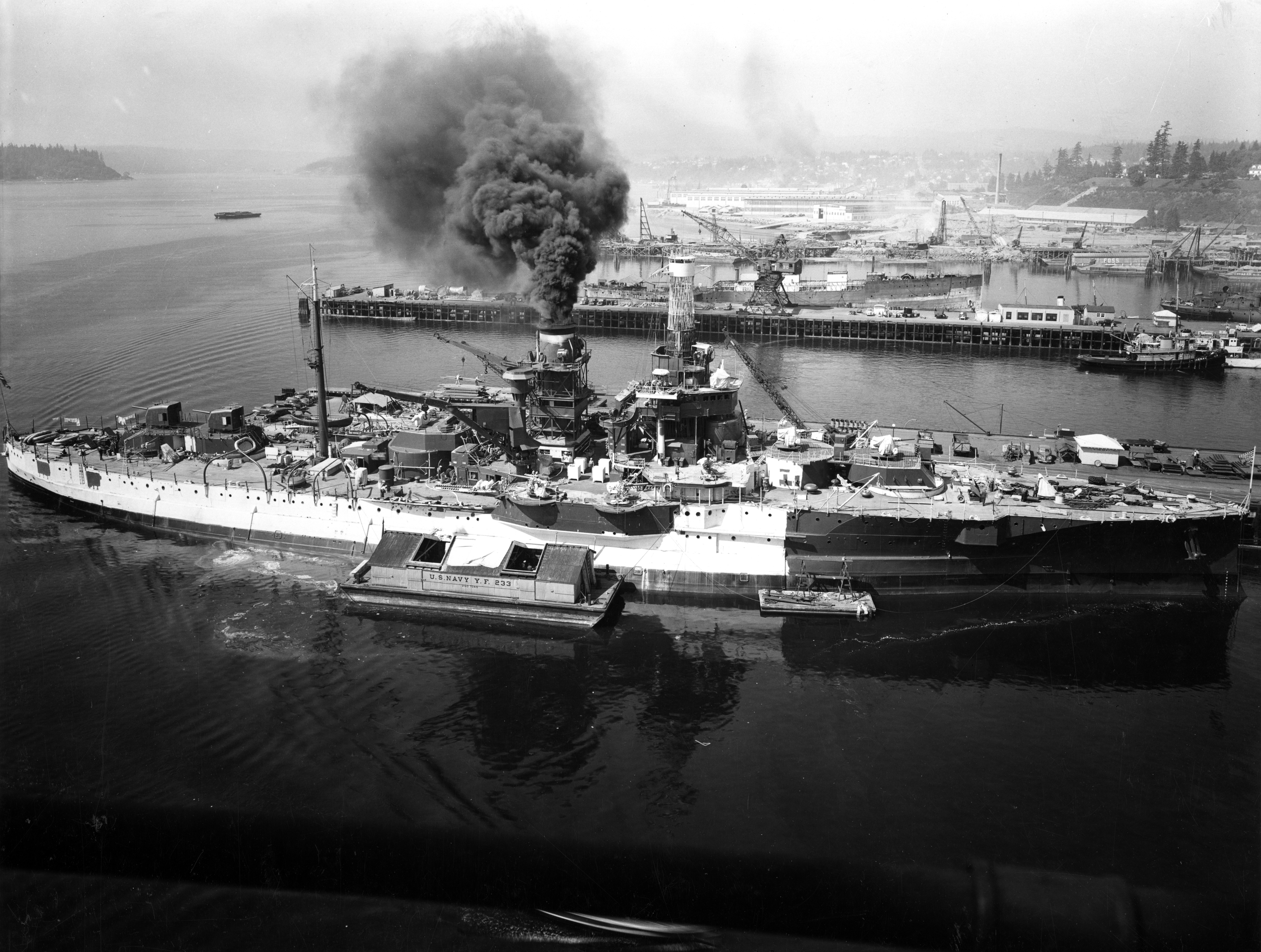
Utah being painted as her 1941 overhaul at Puget Sound nears completion

Utah returned to active duty on 1 December, after which she served with the Scouting Fleet. She left Hampton Roads on 21 November 1928 for another South American cruise. This time, she picked up President-elect Herbert C. Hoover and his entourage in Montevideo, and transported them to Rio de Janeiro in December, and then carried them home to the United States, arriving in Hampton Roads on 6 January 1929. According to the terms of the London Naval Treaty of 1930, Utah was converted into a radio-controlled target ship, to replace the older North Dakota. On 1 July 1931, Utah was accordingly redesignated "AG-16". All of her primary and secondary weapons were removed, though her turrets were still mounted. The plane handling equipment was removed along with the torpedo blisters that were added in 1925. Work was completed by 1 April 1932, when she was recommissioned.

On 7 April, Utah left Norfolk for sea trials to train her engine room crew and to test the radio-control equipment. The ship could be controlled at varying rates of speed and changes of course: maneuvers that a ship would conduct in battle. Her electric motors, operated by signals from the controlling ship, opened and closed throttle valves, moved her steering gear, and regulated the supply of oil to her boilers. In addition, a Sperry gyro pilot kept the ship on course. She passed her radio control trials on 6 May, and on 1 June, the ship was operated for 3 hours under radio control. On 9 June, she again left Norfolk, bound for San Pedro, Los Angeles, where she joined Training Squadron 1, Base Force, United States Fleet. Starting in late July, the ship began her first round of target duty, first for the cruisers of the Pacific Fleet, and then for the battleship Nevada. She continued in this role for the next nine years; she participated in Fleet Problem XVI in May 1935, during which she served as a transport for a contingent of Marines. In June, the ship was modified to train anti-aircraft gunners in addition to her target ship duties. To perform this task, she was equipped with a new 1.1-inch (28 mm)/75 caliber anti-aircraft gun in a quadruple mount for experimental testing and development of the new type of weapon.

Utah returned to the Atlantic to participate in Fleet Problem XX in January 1939, and at the end of the year, she trained with Submarine Squadron 6. She then returned to the Pacific, arriving in Pearl Harbor on 1 August 1940. There, she conducted anti-aircraft gunnery training until 14 December, when she departed for Long Beach, California, arriving on 21 December. There, she served as a bombing target for aircraft from the carriers Lexington, Saratoga, and Enterprise. She returned to Pearl Harbor on 1 April 1941, where she resumed anti-aircraft gunnery training. She cruised to Los Angeles on 20 May to carry a contingent of Marines from the Fleet Marine Force to Bremerton, Washington, after which she entered the Puget Sound Navy Yard on 31 May, where she was overhauled. She was equipped with new 5-inch (127 mm)/38 cal dual-purpose guns in single mounts to improve her ability to train anti-aircraft gunners. She left Puget Sound on 14 September, bound for Pearl Harbor, where she resumed her normal duties through the rest of the year.

=== Attack on Pearl Harbor ===
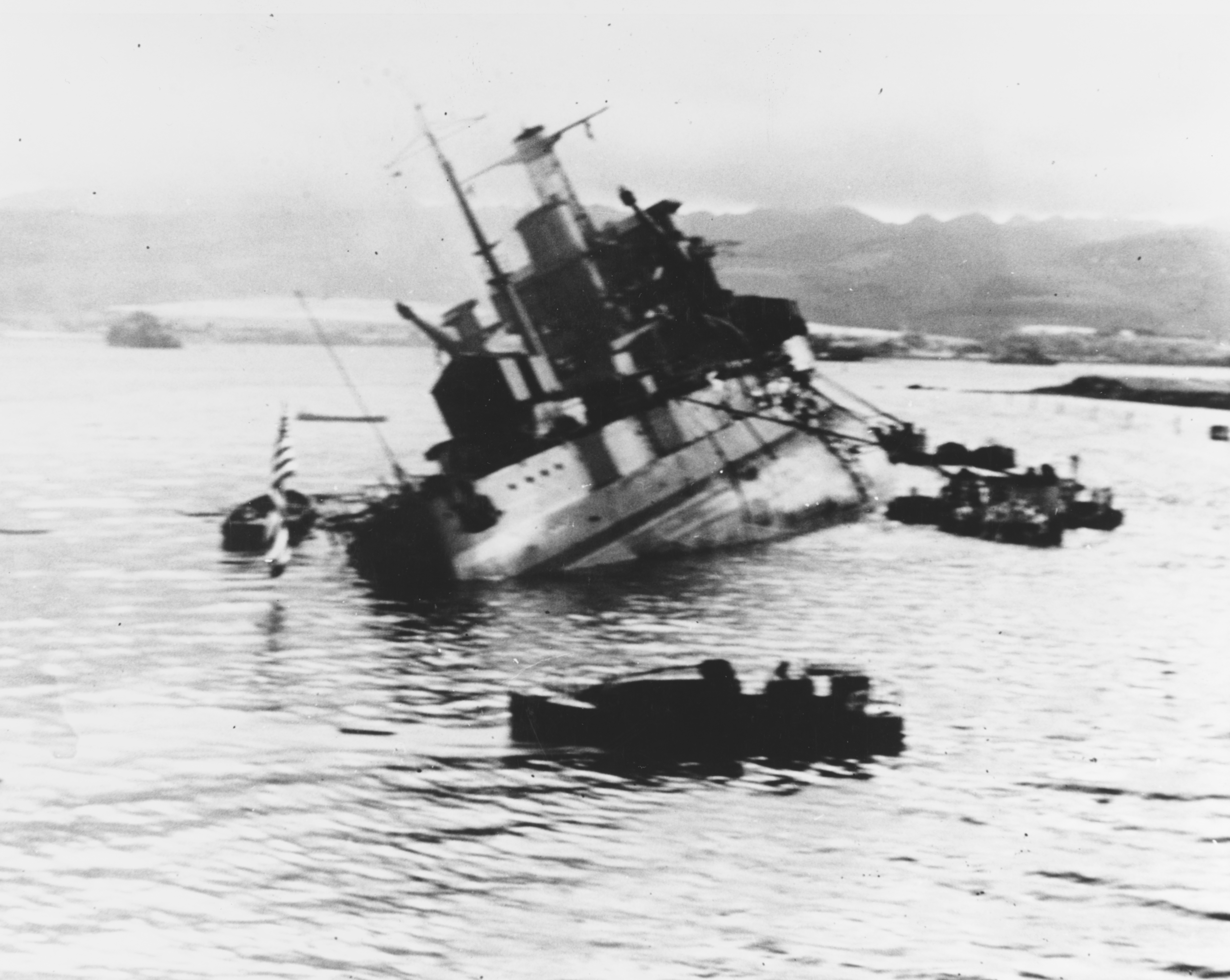
Utah capsizing during the attack on Pearl Harbor

In early December 1941, Utah was moored off Ford Island in berth F-11, after having completed another round of anti-aircraft gunnery training. Shortly before 08:00 on the morning of 7 December, some crewmen aboard Utah observed the first Japanese planes approaching to attack Pearl Harbor, but they assumed they were American aircraft. The Japanese began their attack shortly thereafter, the first bombs falling near a seaplane ramp on the southern tip of Ford Island. At the same time sixteen Nakajima B5N2 torpedo bombers from the Japanese aircraft carriers Sōryū and Hiryū flew over Pearl City approaching the west side of Ford Island. The torpedo bombers were looking for American aircraft carriers, which usually anchored where Utah was moored that morning. The flight leaders identified Utah and rejected her as a target, deciding instead to attack 1010 Dock. However six of the B5Ns from Soryu led by Lieutenant Nakajima Tatsumi broke off to attack Utah, not recognizing that the shapes over the barbettes were not turrets, but boxes covering empty holes. Six torpedoes were launched against Utah, two of them struck the battleship while another missed and hit the cruiser Raleigh.

Serious flooding started to quickly overwhelm Utah and she began to list to port and settle by the stern. As the crew began to abandon ship, one man—Chief Watertender Peter Tomich—remained below decks to ensure as many men as possible could escape, and to keep vital machinery running as long as possible; he received the Medal of Honor posthumously for his actions. At 08:12, Utah rolled over onto her side, while those crew members who had managed to escape swam to shore. Almost immediately after reaching shore, the ship's senior officer on board, Commander Solomon Isquith, heard knocking from men trapped in the capsized ship. He called for volunteers to secure a cutting torch from the badly damaged cruiser Raleigh and attempt to free trapped men; they succeeded in rescuing four men. In total, 58 officers and men were killed, though 461 survived.

=== Salvage ===
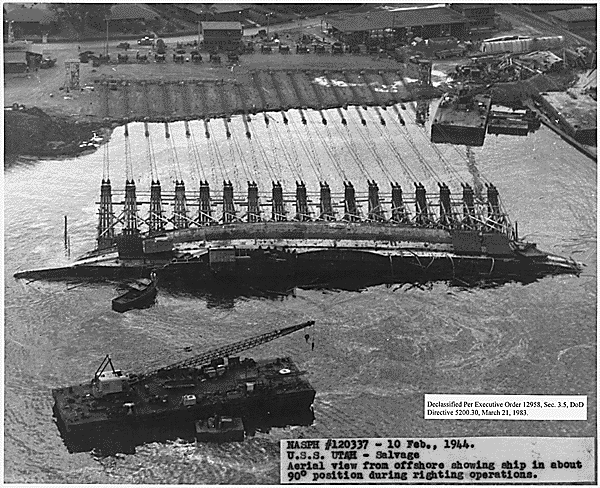
Utah during an ultimately unsuccessful salvage attempt

The Navy declared Utah to be in ordinary on 29 December, and she was placed under the authority of the Pearl Harbor Base Force. Following the successful righting (rotation to upright) of the capsized Oklahoma, an attempt was made to right the Utah by the same parbuckling method using 17 winches. As Utah was rotated, she did not grip the harbor bottom, and slid towards Ford Island. The Utah recovery effort was abandoned, with Utah rotated 38 degrees from horizontal.

As abandoned, Utah cleared her berth. There was no further attempt to refloat her; unlike the battleships sunk at Battleship Row, she had no military value. She was formally placed out of commission on 5 September 1944, and then stricken from the Naval Vessel Register on 13 November. Utah received one battle star for her brief service during World War II. Her rusting hulk remains in Pearl Harbor, partially above water; the men killed when Utah sank were never removed from the wreck, and as such, she is considered a war grave.

== Memorial ==
Around 1950, two memorials were placed at the wreck dedicated to the men in the ship's crew who were killed in the attack on Pearl Harbor. The first is a plaque on the wharf to the north of the ship, and the second is a plaque that was placed on the ship itself. In 1972, a larger memorial was erected just off Ford Island, near the sunken wreck, and is now part of Pearl Harbor National Memorial. The memorial consists of a 70-foot (21 m) walkway made of white concrete, which extends from Ford Island out to a 40 by 15 ft (12.2 by 4.6 m) platform in front of the ship, where a brass plaque and a flagpole are located. The memorial is on the northwest side of Ford Island and is accessible only to individuals with military identification. A color guard stands watch over the wreck. On 9 July 1988, Utah and Arizona, the other remaining wreck in the harbor, were nominated to be added to the National Historic Landmark registry. Both wrecks were added to the list on 5 May 1989. As of 2024, seventeen former crewmen who were aboard Utah at the time of her sinking have been cremated and had their ashes interred in the wreck.

Relics from the ship are also preserved in the Utah State Capitol building; among the items on display are pieces from the ship's silver service and the captain's clock. The ship's bell was on display at the University of Utah near the entrance of the Naval Science Building from the 1960s until 2016, when it was loaned to the Naval War College. It was then sent to the Naval History and Heritage Command in Richmond, Virginia for conservation work. With the bell restored, it was returned to the University of Utah on 7 December 2017 and is currently on display inside the Naval Science Building.

USS Utah Memorial
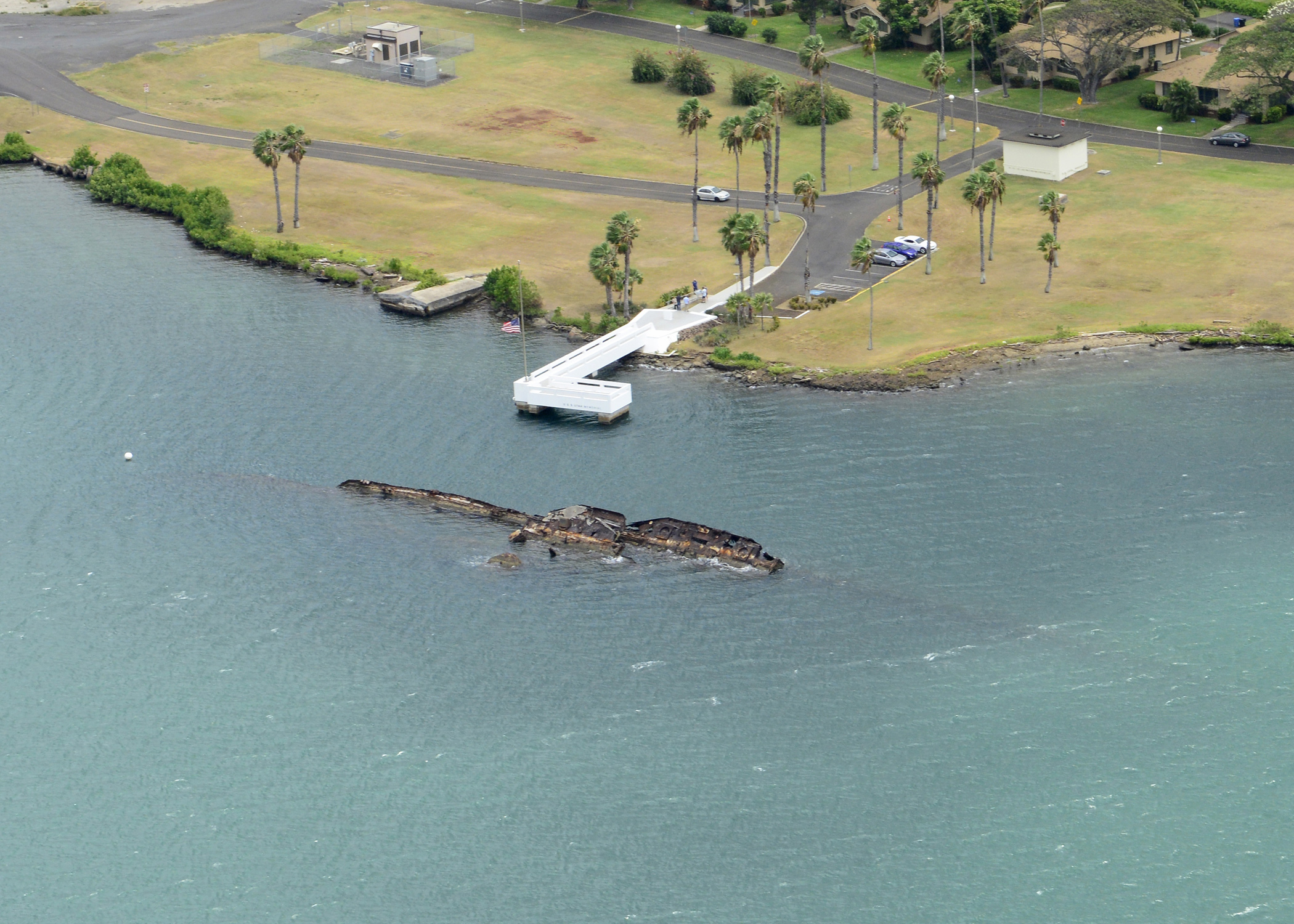
Utah Memorial in 2016

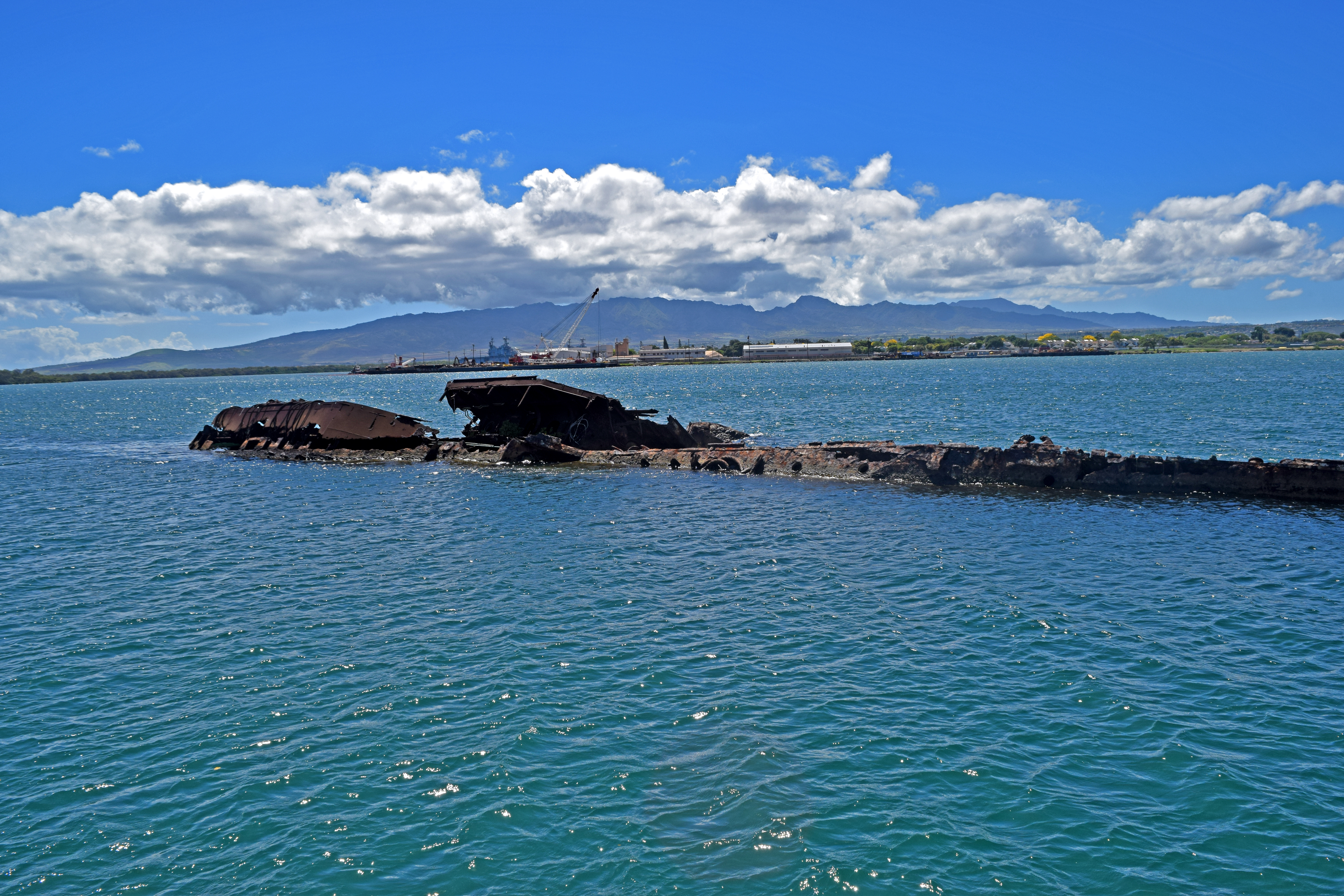
The wreck seen from the memorial, c. 2016

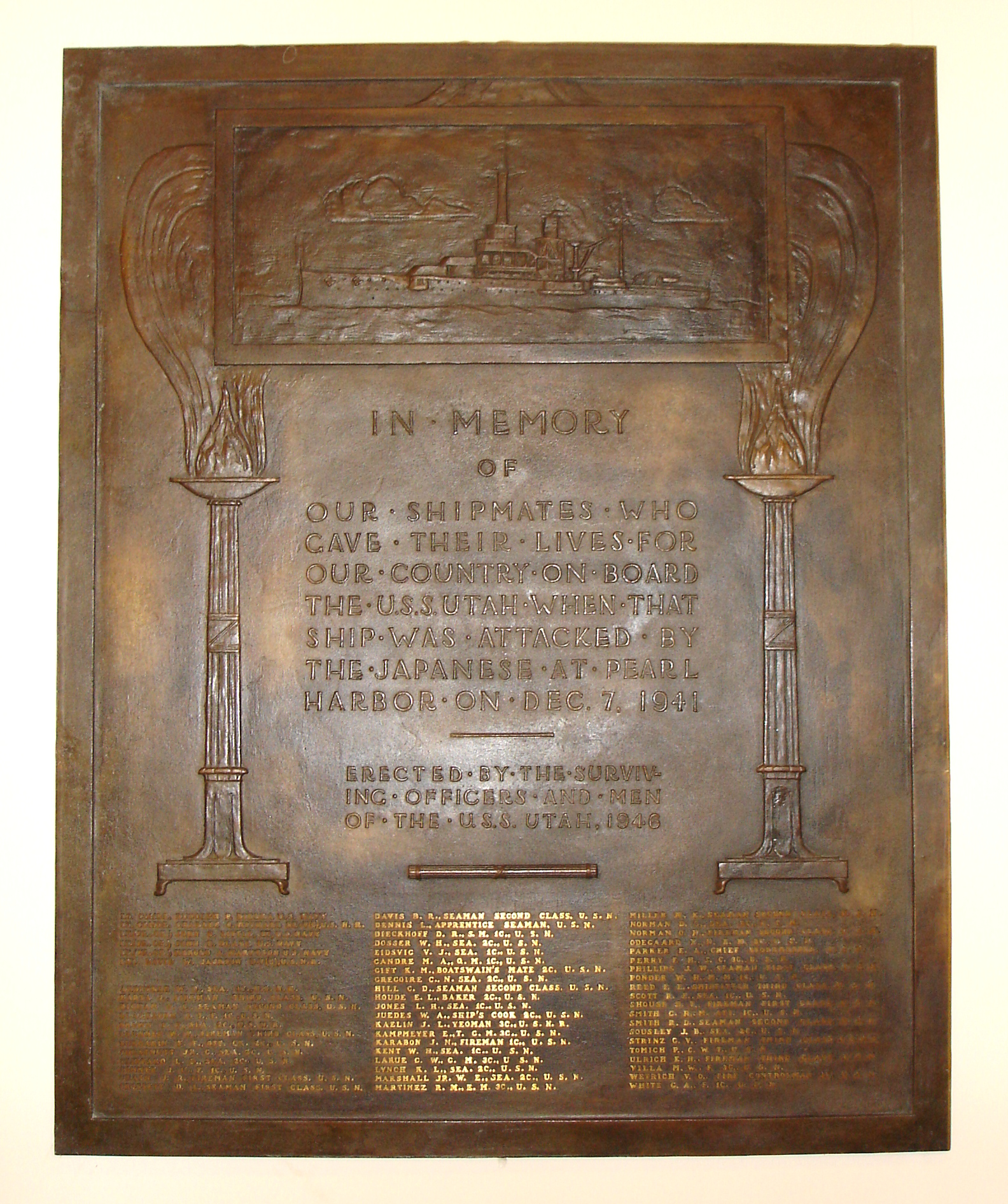
Plaque at the Utah State Capitol memorializing the men killed in the attack
