= Florida-class battleship =

Dreadnought battleship class of the United States Navy

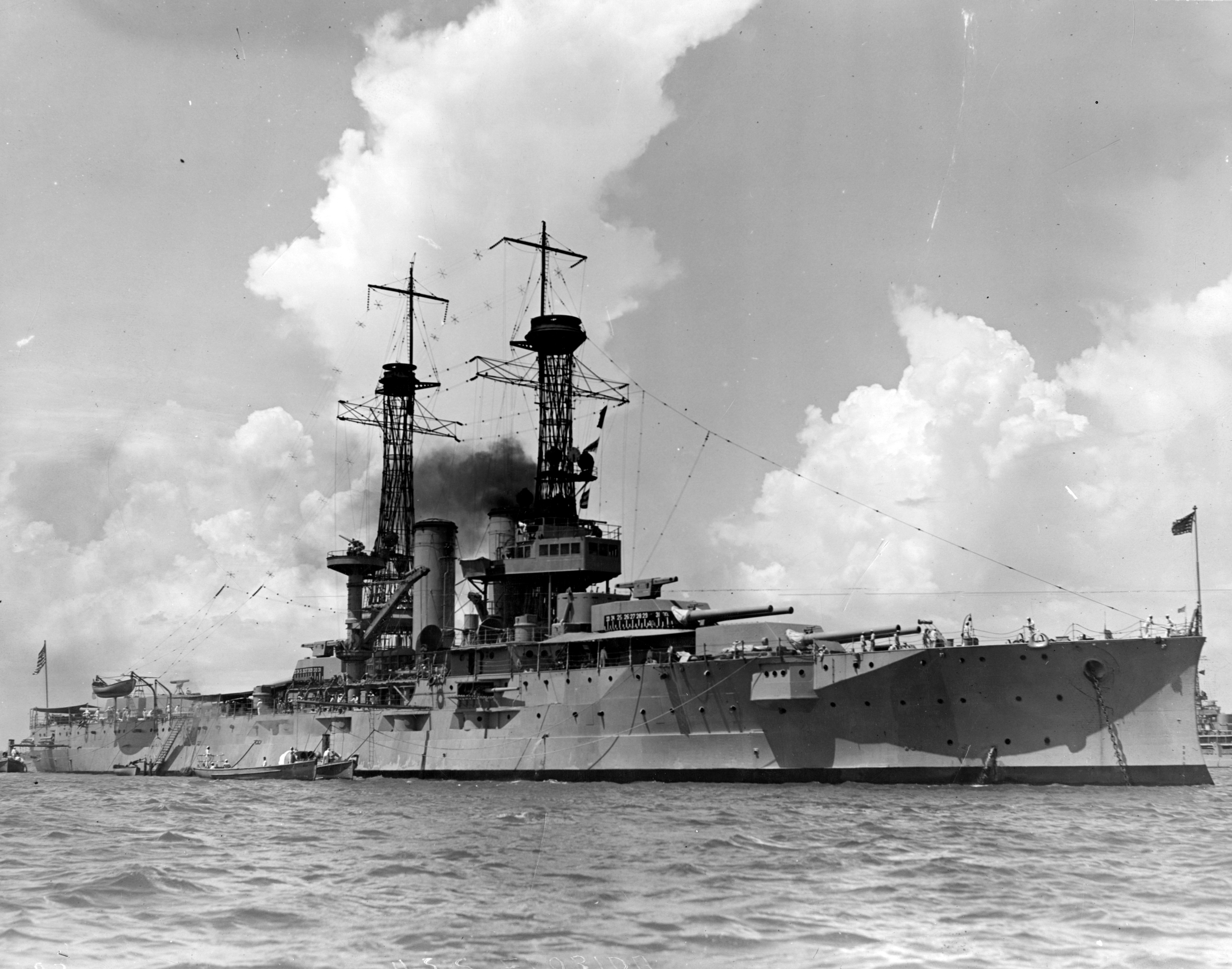
- USS Florida (BB-30)

Class overview
- Name: Florida-class battleship
- Builders: New York Naval Shipyard; New York Shipbuilding Corporation
- Operators: United States Navy
- Preceded by: Delaware class
- Succeeded by: Wyoming class
- Built: 1909–1911
- In service: 1911–1941
- Completed: 2
- Lost: 1
- Retired: 1

General characteristics
- Type: Dreadnought battleship
- Displacement: Normal: 21,825 long tons (22,175 t); Full load: 23,033 long tons (23,403 t)
- Length: 521 ft 6 in (159.0 m) (overall); 510 ft (155.4 m) (waterline)
- Beam: 88 ft 3 in (26.9 m)
- Draft: 28 ft 6 in (8.7 m) (mean); 30 ft 1 in (9.2 m) (max)
- Installed power: 12 × Babcock & Wilcox coal-fired superheating water-tube boilers; 28,000 shp (20,880 kW)
- Propulsion: 4 × Parsons steam turbines; 4 × screws
- Speed: 21 kn (39 km/h; 24 mph)
- Range: 5,776 nmi (6,647 mi; 10,697 km) at 10 kn (19 km/h; 12 mph); 2,760 nmi (3,176 mi; 5,112 km) at 20 kn (37 km/h; 23 mph)
- Capacity: Coal: 1,667 long tons (1,694 t) (standard); Coal: 2,520 long tons (2,560 t) (max); Oil: 400 long tons (406 t)
- Complement: 1,001 officers and men
- Armament: 10 × 12 in (305 mm)/45-caliber Mark 5 guns; 16 × 5 in (127 mm)/51 cal guns; 4 × 6-pounder 57 mm (2.2 in) guns; 2 × 1-pounder 37 mm (1.5 in) guns; 2 × 21 in (533 mm) torpedo tubes
- Armor: Belt: 9–11 in (229–279 mm); Lower casemate: 8–10 in (203–254 mm); Upper casemate: 5 in (127 mm); Barbettes: 4–10 in (102–254 mm); Turret face: 12 in (305 mm); Conning tower: 11.5 in (292 mm); Decks: 1.5 in (38 mm)

The Florida-class battleships of the United States Navy comprised two ships: Florida and Utah. Launched in 1910 and 1909 respectively and commissioned in 1911, they were slightly larger than the preceding Delaware class design but were otherwise very similar. This was the first US battleship class in which all ships received steam turbine engines. In the previous Delaware-class, North Dakota received steam turbine propulsion as an experiment while Delaware retained triple-expansion engines.

Both ships were involved in the 1914 Second Battle of Vera Cruz, deploying their Marine contingents as part of the operation. Following the entrance of the United States into World War I in 1917, both ships were deployed to Europe. Florida was assigned to the British Grand Fleet and based in Scapa Flow; in December 1918 she escorted President Woodrow Wilson to France for the peace negotiations. Utah was assigned to convoy escort duty; she was based in Ireland and was tasked with protecting convoys as they approached the European continent.

Retained under the Washington Naval Treaty of 1922, both ships were modernized significantly, with torpedo bulges and oil-fired boilers installed and other improvements made, but were demilitarized under terms of the 1930 London Naval Treaty. Florida was scrapped, Utah converted into first a radio-controlled target ship, then an anti-aircraft gunnery trainer. She served in the latter role until sunk by the Japanese during the attack on Pearl Harbor on 7 December 1941. Her hull became deeply stuck in silt and mud as she sank, and thus was never raised. It remains on the bottom of the harbor as a war memorial.

== Design ==
The Floridas were the third of 10 separate classes built between 1906 and 1919, a total of 22 battleships being commissioned. The new dreadnoughts of the American battle line were being designed from pre-dreadnought experience and observation of foreign designs, as no US dreadnought had yet been commissioned at the time that the Floridas were designed; all were either at some stage of building or in design. American capital ship design was also heavily influenced by war games conducted at the US Navy's Naval War College. Captain William Sims led a reform movement that assigned warship design to the General Board.

These ships were an improvement over the preceding Delaware class. Their engine rooms were larger to hold four Curtis or Parsons steam turbines. Their larger beam gave them greater metacentric height, in which the Delawares were notably deficient, which improved buoyancy and reduced hull stress. The ships mounted new 5-inch (127 mm)/51-caliber guns as secondary batteries in casemates that boasted increased armor protection. The class retained the large and fully enclosed conning towers that were adopted for the preceding Delawares, as a result of American studies of the Battle of Tsushima in 1905. The design reduced the vulnerability of the command staff. Overall, these ships were much better protected than their British counterparts, although they were modified extensively during the interwar period.

=== General characteristics ===
The Florida-class ships were 510 ft (160 m) long at the waterline and 521 ft 6 in (158.95 m) overall. They had a beam of 88 ft 3 in (26.90 m) and a draft of 28 ft 6 in (8.69 m). They displaced 21,825 long tons (22,175 t) at standard displacement and 23,033 long tons (23,403 t) at full load. This was an increase of approximately 2,500 long tons (2,500 t) over the previous Delaware class. The ships also had some of their superstructure rearranged, including the lattice masts and the funnels. The Florida-class ships had a crew of 1,001 officers and men. The wider beam increased the vessels' metacentric height, which allowed the Floridas to accommodate their larger medium-caliber guns without any real penalty in topweight.

Florida was fitted experimentally with a larger bridge than was then standard, to house both ship and fire control personnel under armor, while Utah received a heavily armored fire-control tower atop a standard-sized bridge. The former proved especially successful, to the point that when a larger armored fire-control tower and standard bridge was proposed for the Nevada class, it was rejected in favor of a roomier bridge like that of Florida.

The two ships were modernized in 1925–27; among the improvements were the addition of torpedo bulges, which were designed to increase resistance to underwater damage—this widened the ships to 106 ft (32 m). The ships also had their rear lattice masts removed and replaced with a pole mast. A catapult for launching aircraft was mounted on the number 3 gun turret.

=== Propulsion ===
The ships were propelled by four-shaft Parsons steam turbines; steam was provided by 12 Babcock & Wilcox coal-fired boilers. The engines were rated at 28,000 shp (20,880 kW) to give a top speed of 21 kn (39 km/h). On trials, Florida made 22.08 kn (40.89 km/h; 25.41 mph) on 40,511 shp (30,209 kW); Utah's turbines produced only 27,028 shp (20,155 kW) but still propelled the ship at 21.04 kn (38.97 km/h; 24.21 mph). However, the engine and boiler room arrangements remained the same as in the Delawares, with the engine room situated between the rear main turrets and steam lines running beneath the superfiring rear turret. The ships had a range of 5,776 nmi (6,650 mi; 10,700 km) at a cruising speed of 10 kn (19 km/h; 12 mph).

The engine rooms on these ships were lengthened to accommodate the larger Parsons steam turbines, which meant the after boiler room had to be eliminated. Funnel spacing was therefore closer than in the Delawares. The remaining boiler rooms were widened by 4 ft (1.2 m); to do this and maintain adequate underwater and coal bunker protection, the ships were made 3 ft (0.91 m) beamier than the Delawares. During Florida and Utah's reconstruction in 1925–1927, their coal-fired boilers were replaced with four White-Forster oil-fired boilers. The reduction in the number of boilers allowed their twin funnels to be trunked into one single larger funnel.

=== Armament ===
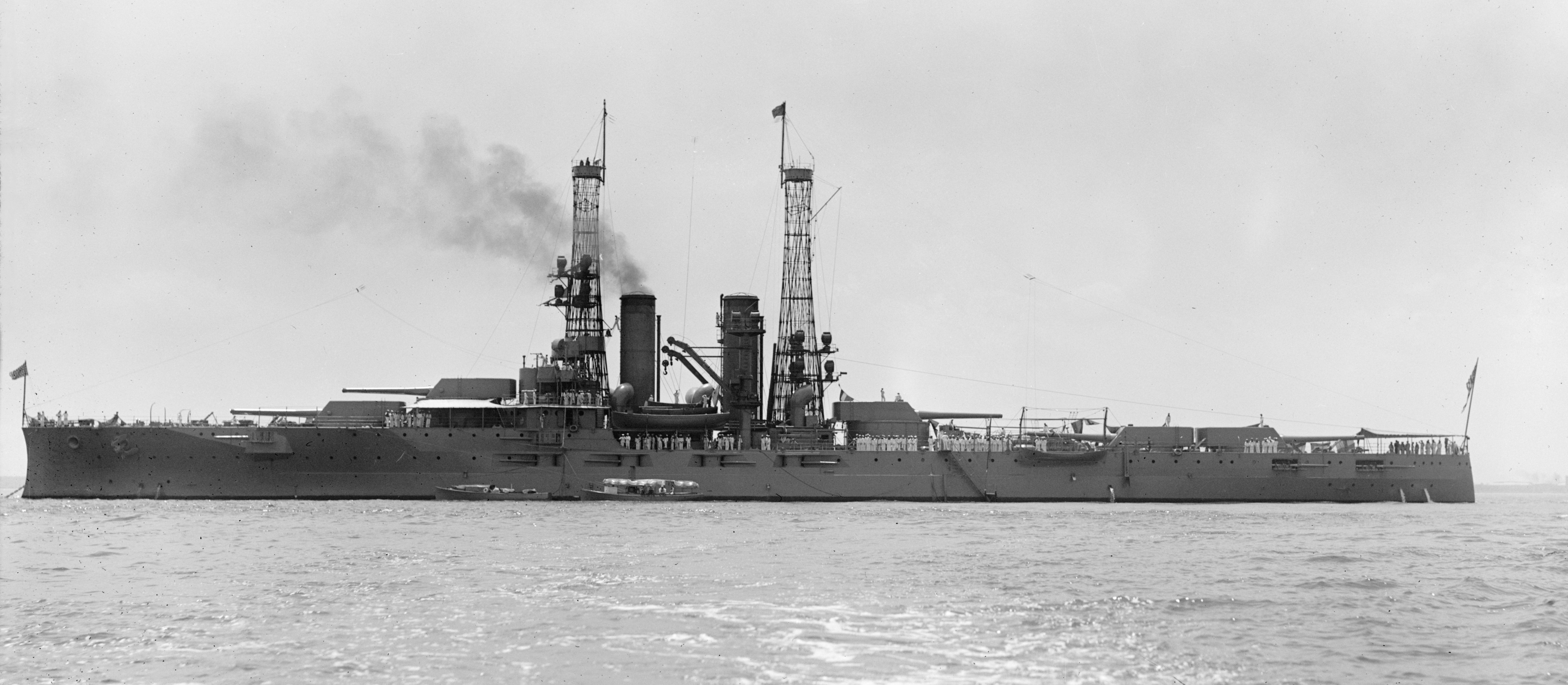
Port side view of Florida-class battleship, with ten 12"/45-caliber Mark 5 main guns arranged exactly the same as on the Delaware-class ships

==== Main guns ====
It was intended originally to arm these ships with eight 14-inch (356 mm)/45-caliber guns then in development in superfiring fore-and-aft mountings. As this gun did not go into service until 1914, the arrangement of ten 12-inch (305 mm)/45-caliber Mark 5 guns in five twin gun turrets was retained from the Delaware class. The gun housings were the Mark 8 type, and they allowed for depression to −5 degrees and elevation to 15 degrees. The guns had a rate of fire of 2 to 3 rounds per minute. They fired 870 lb (395 kg) shells, of either armor-piercing (AP) or Common types, though the Common type was obsolete by 1915 and put out of production. The propellant charge was 310 lb (141 kg) in silk bags, and provided a muzzle velocity of 2,700 ft/s (823 m/s). The guns were expected to fire 175 rounds before the barrels would require replacement. The two ships carried 100 shells per gun, or 1,000 rounds in total. At 15 degrees elevation, the guns could hit targets out to approximately 20,000 yd (18,288 m)

Unfortunately, the turret layout of the Delawares was also retained, with its respective challenges. Two turrets, Numbers 1 and 2, were mounted fore in a superfiring pair, while the other three were mounted aft of the main superstructure, all on the centerline. The rearmost turret, number 5, was placed on the main deck, facing rearward, the next turret, Number 4, was placed on the main deck facing forward, but could only have fired on either broadside, it could not have fired straight forward or aft. The center turret, Number 3, placed in a superfiring position facing rearward, could not fire astern when the turret directly under it had its guns trained forward. This left only the rearmost turret, with its pair of 12-inch guns, to cover the rear quarter of the ship. Also, since the engine room was situated between the superfiring rear turret and the ones behind it, steam lines ran from the boiler rooms amidships around the ammunition magazine for Number 3 turret to the engine room. These lines, it was later found, had the potential to heat the powder in the magazine and degrade its ballistics. This design flaw was also prevalent in several British dreadnoughts but was considered inescapable by naval designers on structural grounds.

==== Other weapons ====
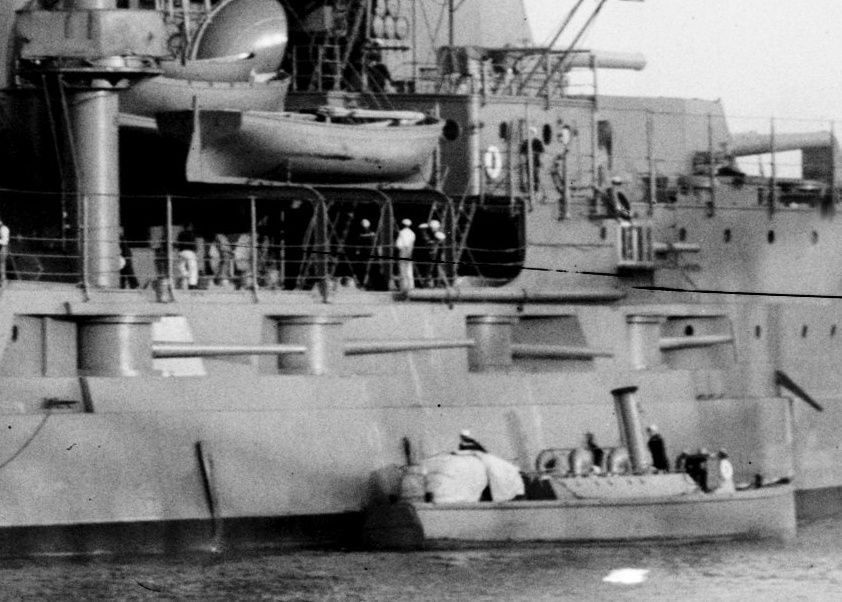
Starboard forward battery of 5"/51-caliber guns on Utah

C&R proposed 6-inch (152 mm) secondary guns for these ships, protected by 6.5 in (165 mm) casemate armor. This would have been the only change from the protective scheme carried over from the Delaware class. However, a new 5-inch/51-caliber gun was adopted instead after concerns about inadequate splinter protection for secondary gun casemates and smoke uptakes led to an increase in armor. Sixteen of these weapons were fitted in individual casemates. These guns fired a 50 lb (23 kg) armor-piercing (AP) shell at a muzzle velocity of 3,150 ft/s (960 m/s) and a rate of 8 to 9 rounds per minute. The guns could depress to −10 degrees and elevate to 15 degrees. The guns were manually operated, and had a range of train of about 150 degrees in either direction.

Florida and Utah received two 3-inch (76 mm)/23-caliber guns in 1917 for anti-aircraft (AA) defense. This was increased to eight guns between 1926 and 1928. These guns fired a 16.5 lb (7 kg) shell at a muzzle velocity of 1,650 ft/s (503 m/s) to a maximum range of 8,800 yd (8,047 m) and ceiling of 18,000 ft (5,486 m) at an elevation of 75 degrees and a rate of between eight and nine rounds per minute.

The ships were also armed with two 21-inch (533 mm) submerged torpedo tubes. The tubes were mounted one on each broadside. Each ship carried a total of eight torpedoes. The torpedoes were 16.4 ft (5 m) long and carried a 200 lb (91 kg) warhead. They had a range of 4,000 yd (3,658 m) and traveled at a speed of 26 kn (48 km/h; 30 mph).

=== Armor ===
The armor layout was largely the same as in the preceding Delaware-class battleships. The armored belt ranged in thickness from 9 to 11 in (229 to 279 mm) in the more important areas of the ship. Casemated guns mounted in the hull had between 8 and 10 in (203 and 254 mm) of armor plate. After modernization, some of the casemated guns were moved to the superstructure; these guns were protected with only 5 in (127 mm) of armor. The barbettes that housed the main gun turrets were armored with between 4 and 10 in (102 and 254 mm) of armor; the side portions more vulnerable to shell fire were thicker, while the front and rear sections of the barbette, which were less likely to be hit, received thinner armor to save weight. The gun turrets themselves were armored with 12 in (305 mm) of armor. The conning tower was 11.5 in (292 mm) thick. The armored deck was slightly reduced in thickness, from 2 to 1.5 in (51 to 38 mm).

== Construction ==
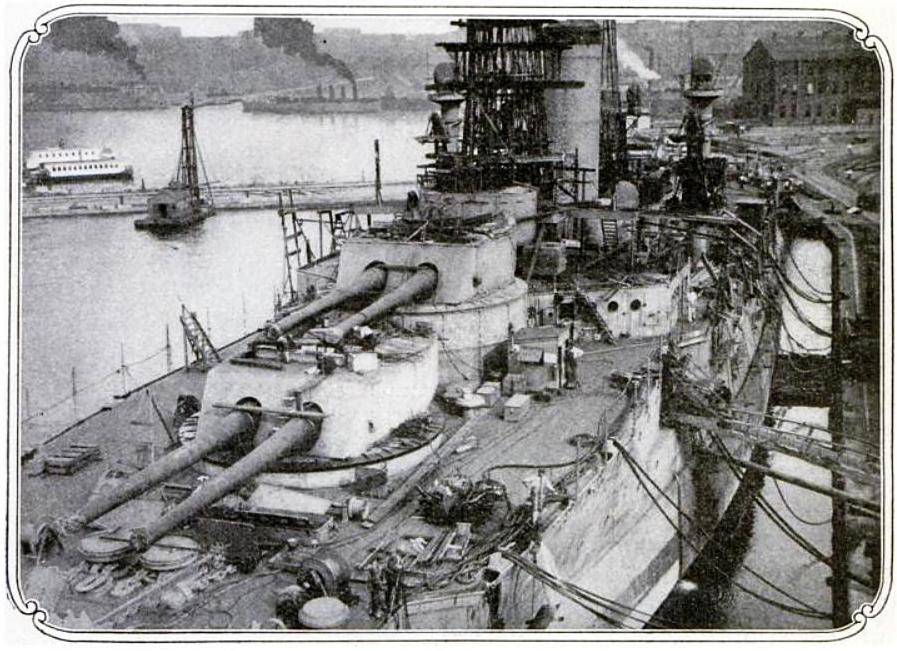
Florida during her final fitting out at the Brooklyn Navy Yard

Florida, ordered under hull number "Battleship #30", was laid down at the Brooklyn Navy Yard in New York on 9 March 1909. She was launched on 12 May 1910, after which fitting out work commenced. She was completed on 15 September 1911, and commissioned into the United States Navy. Utah was ordered under hull number "Battleship #31". She was laid down in Camden, New Jersey, at the New York Shipbuilding Corporation, 6 days later on 15 March. Work proceeded faster on Utah than on her sister ship, and she was launched about four and a half months earlier, on 23 December 1909. Her fitting out lasted until 31 August 1911, when she was commissioned into the Navy.

== Service history ==
Construction data
Ship name	Hull no.	Builder	Laid down	Launched	Commissioned	Decommissioned	Fate
Florida	BB-30	Brooklyn Navy Yard, New York	8 March 1909	12 May 1910	15 September 1911	16 February 1931	Broken up at Philadelphia, 1931
Utah	BB-31	New York Shipbuilding Corporation, Camden	9 March 1909	23 December 1909	31 August 1911	5 September 1944	Sunk in air attack, 7 December 1941

=== USS Florida ===
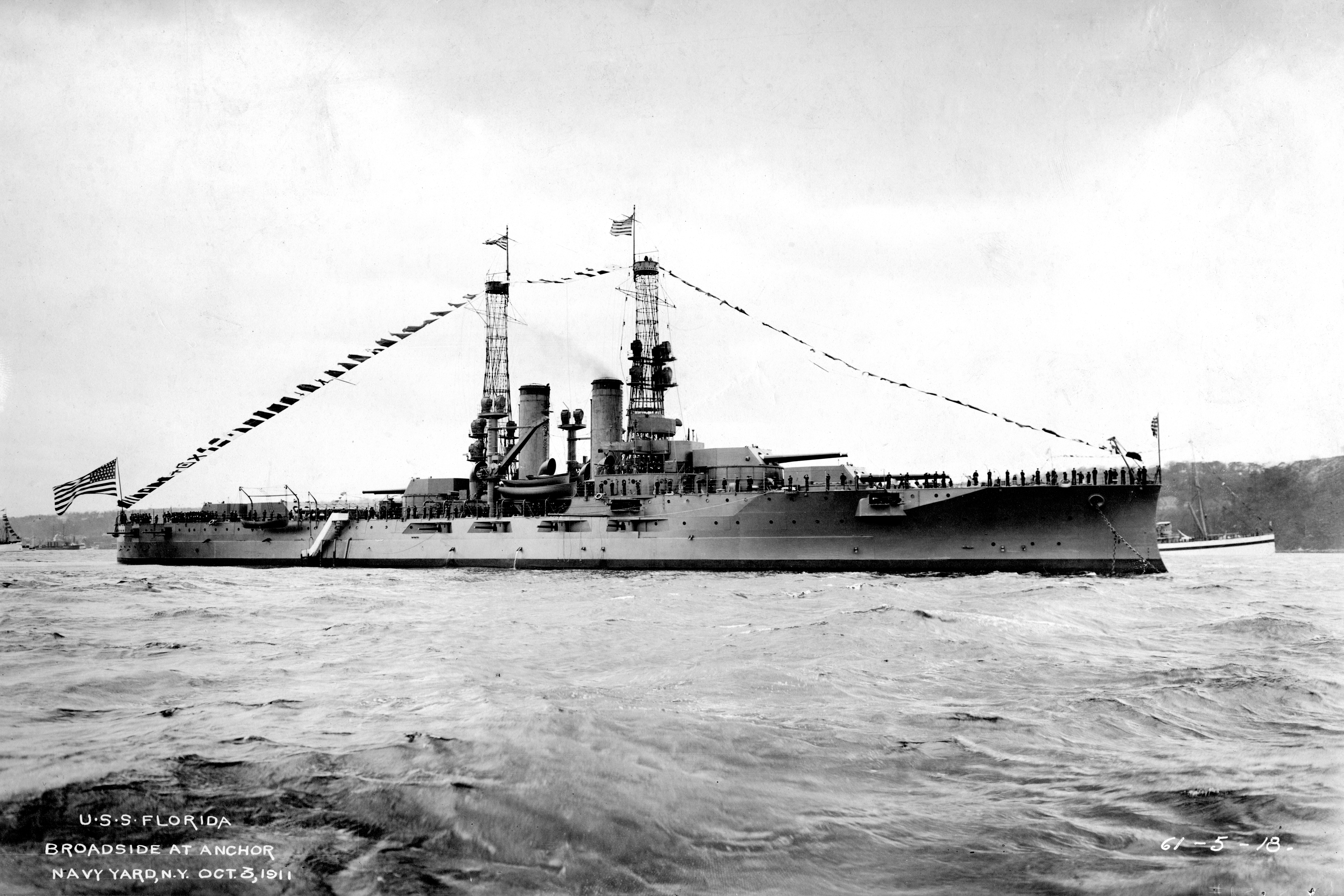
Florida "dressed ship" during the Naval Review in New York, 1911

Florida took part in the Second battle of Vera Cruz in 1914. She and her sister Utah were the first two ships on the scene; the two ships landed some 1,000 sailors and Marines under the command of Florida's captain on 21 April. Fighting lasted for 3 days; the contingent from Florida and Utah suffered a total of 94 casualties.

After the United States entered World War I in April 1917, Florida was dispatched to Europe; she departed the United States in December 1917. After arriving in the North Sea, she was assigned to the British Grand Fleet. The ship, part of the US Navy's Battleship Division Nine, under the command of Rear Admiral Hugh Rodman, arrived on 7 December and was assigned to the 6th Battle Squadron of the Grand Fleet. Following training exercises with the British fleet, 6th Battle Squadron was tasked with convoy protection duty on the route to Scandinavia. Following the end of the war, in December 1918, the ship escorted President Woodrow Wilson on his trip to Europe to participate in the peace negotiations at Versailles. Later in December, Florida returned to the United States to participate in the Victory Fleet Review in New York harbor.

Post-war, Florida returned to the US Navy's Atlantic Fleet; she operated along the east coast of the United States and into Central America. In July 1920, she was assigned the hull number "BB-30". In December 1920, she carried the US Secretary of State, Bainbridge Colby, on a diplomatic trip around the Caribbean and South America. Florida was the oldest American battleship that was retained under the terms of the Washington Naval Treaty of 1922. She underwent extensive reconstruction and modernization during the mid-1920s. After emerging from the shipyard, she was assigned as the flagship of the Control Force, US Fleet. The ship conducted a series of training cruises for the remainder of the decade. Under the London Naval Treaty of 1930, the ship was to be discarded. She was decommissioned in February 1931 and towed to the Philadelphia Naval Shipyard, where she was broken up for scrap.

=== USS Utah ===
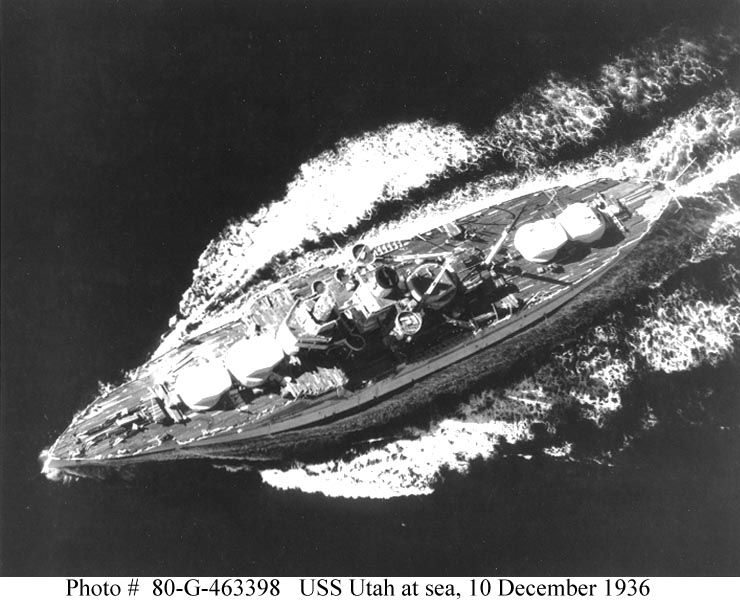
Utah at sea serving as a radio-controlled target ship in 1936

Utah's first assignment was with the US Navy's Atlantic Fleet. During 1913, she took a goodwill voyage to the Mediterranean. Utah was also involved in the Second Battle of Vera Cruz, alongside her sister Florida. The ship also saw front-line duty in the First World War, although she was not attached to the British Grand Fleet. Starting in September 1918, Utah was based in Bantry Bay, Ireland. Here she conducted convoy escort duties on the approach to Europe.

Post-war service saw Utah again in the Atlantic Fleet; during 1921–22, she was stationed in Europe. Utah was also retained under the Washington Naval Treaty. In 1924–1925, the ship sailed on a goodwill cruise to South America. Following her return to the United States, she was taken into dry dock for significant reconstruction. After she rejoined the active fleet, she was assigned to the US Scouting Fleet. Late in 1928, she steamed to the South Atlantic, where she picked up President-Elect Herbert Hoover, who was returning from an ambassadorial visit to several South American countries.

According to the London Naval Treaty, the ship was to be removed from front-line service. In 1931 she had her main battery guns removed and was converted into a radio-controlled target ship. She was redesignated AG-16, and served in this capacity through 1941. In 1935 she was rebuilt again, gaining a single 1.1-inch (28 mm)/75-caliber anti-aircraft gun in a quadruple mount for experimental testing and development of the new type of weapon. She continued her role as a target ship, and in 1941 had several additional anti-aircraft guns installed to increase her capacity to train gunners. Later that year she was transferred to the US Pacific Fleet and based in Pearl Harbor. She was present in Pearl Harbor on 7 December 1941, was hit by two torpedoes, capsized, and sank. A few years later, the hull was partially righted and towed closer to Ford Island in a failed salvage effort, where the wreck remains today.
