= Delaware-class battleship =

Dreadnought battleship class of the United States Navy

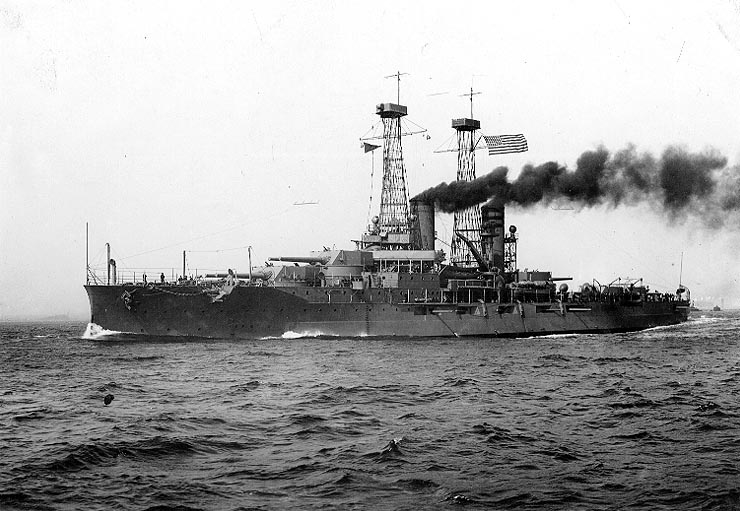
- USS North Dakota, the second ship of the class

Class overview
- Name: Delaware-class battleship
- Builders: Newport News Shipbuilding; Fore River Shipyard
- Operators: United States Navy
- Preceded by: South Carolina class
- Succeeded by: Florida class
- In commission: 1910–1923
- Planned: 2
- Completed: 2
- Retired: 2

General characteristics
- Type: Dreadnought battleship
- Displacement: Normal: 20,380 long tons (20,707 t); Full load: 22,400 long tons (22,759 t)
- Length: 518 ft 9 in (158 m) (overall); 510 ft (155 m) (waterline)
- Beam: 85 ft 3 in (26 m)
- Draft: 27 ft 3 in (8 m) (mean); 28 ft 10 in (9 m) (max)
- Installed power: 14 × coal-fired superheating Babcock & Wilcox water-tube boilers; 25,000 shp (18,642 kW) (design)
- Propulsion: 2 × sets Vertical triple expansion Delaware; Curtis Steam turbines North Dakota; 2 × screws
- Speed: 21 kn (24 mph; 39 km/h)
- Range: 6,000 nmi (11,000 km) at 10 kn (12 mph; 19 km/h)
- Complement: 933 officers and men
- Armament: 10 × 12 in (305 mm)/45 caliber Mark 5 guns; 14 × 5 in (127 mm)/50 cal Mark 6 guns; 2 × 3-pounder 47 mm (1.85 in)/40 cal guns; 4 × 1-pounder 37 mm (1.46 in) guns; 2 × 21 in (533 mm) torpedo tubes (submerged)
- Armor: Belt: 9–11 in (229–279 mm); Lower casemate: 8–10 in (203–254 mm); Upper casemate: 5 in (127 mm); Barbettes: 4–10 in (102–254 mm); Turret face: 12 in (305 mm); Conning tower: 11.5 in (292 mm); Decks: 2 in (51 mm)

The Delaware-class battleships of the United States Navy were the second class of American dreadnoughts; the class comprised two ships: Delaware and North Dakota. With this class, the 16,000 long tons (16,257 t) limit imposed on capital ships by the United States Congress was waived, which allowed designers at the Navy's Bureau of Construction and Repair to correct what they considered flaws in the preceding South Carolina class and produce ships not only more powerful but also more effective and rounded overall. Launched in 1909, these ships became the first in US naval history to exceed 20,000 long tons (20,321 t).

The Delawares carried a battery of ten 12-inch (305 mm) guns in five turrets, an increase of two guns over the South Carolinas. With these ships, the US Navy re-adopted a full-fledged medium-caliber weapon for anti-torpedo boat defense. While the 5-inch (127 mm) gun was smaller than that used by other major navies, this would, with few exceptions, become the standard medium-gun caliber for the US Navy for the better part of the 20th century. As for speed, the Delawares were capable of 21 kn (24 mph; 39 km/h), a significant improvement over the earlier class's 18.5 kn (21 mph; 34 km/h). This would become the speed for all American standard-type battleships. Propulsion systems were mixed; while North Dakota was fitted with steam turbines, Delaware retained triple-expansion engines. Direct-drive turbines were much less fuel-efficient, a significant concern for a Navy with Pacific responsibilities but lacking Britain's extensive network of coaling stations.

These ships saw varied service during their careers. During World War I, Delaware was part of Battleship Division Nine of the US Atlantic Fleet, and was assigned to the British Grand Fleet. She escorted convoys and participated in the blockade of the German High Seas Fleet. In contrast, North Dakota remained on the American coast throughout the war, due in part to worries about her troublesome turbine engines. Post-war, they conducted training cruises with the US Atlantic Fleet. In 1924, Delaware was broken up for scrap metal in accordance with the Washington Naval Treaty of 1922. North Dakota survived until 1931, when she too was scrapped, under the terms of the 1930 London Naval Treaty.

== Design ==
Prompted by the launch of and misinformation about HMS Dreadnought, the US Navy and Congress faced what they perceived as a vastly better battleship than the two South Carolina battleships then under construction, which were designed under tonnage constraints that Congress had imposed on capital ships. Actually, the South Carolinas were inferior only in speed to Dreadnought; they carried fewer heavy guns but, unlike Dreadnought, could bring all of them to bear on the broadside. Because of this, they could fire an equal weight of metal. Also, because greater time and care had been taken with their armor and bulkhead arrangement, they were better protected than the British ship. None of this was realized at the time. Nevertheless, the Navy's Bureau of Construction and Repair (C&R) had struggled tremendously to design an adequate warship under congressional limits and had taken battleship design as far under those restrictions as it could. Seeing now that those limits had become unrealistic, Congress ended them; any subsequent constraints would be dictated by treaty limitations. The language of the authorizing act of June 26, 1906 was for a battleship "carrying as heavy armor and as a powerful armament as any known vessel of its class, to have the highest practicable speed and the greatest practicable radius of action."

The Delaware class was the second of 11 distinct US capital ship designs begun from 1906 to 1919; some 29 battleships and six battlecruisers were laid down during this period, though seven of the battleships and all six of the battlecruisers were cancelled. Except for the Lexington-class battlecruisers, these were all relatively slow ships, designed for no more than 23 kn (26 mph; 43 km/h). They ranged in displacement from 16,000 to 42,000 long tons (16,257 to 42,674 t). At this time, no US dreadnought class battleship had yet hit the water as all were either at some stage of building or in design. Virtually the entire US Navy battle line was being designed by drawing on experience from pre-dreadnought designs, or from observation of foreign battleship design.

The design for these ships was actually ready in 1905 or 1906. Two variants were offered—a 10-gun version on 20,500 long tons (20,829 t) and a 12-gun alternative on 24,000 long tons (24,385 t). The larger ship was rejected as too expensive for the firepower it offered, even after its displacement was reduced to 22,000 long tons (22,353 t) tons. Also, because C&R was required to consider private designs, construction on the Delawares did not commence until 1907. None of the private designs was considered remotely satisfactory by the Navy. However, Fore River later developed its version into the battleship Rivadavia, which was built for the Argentine navy. While the C&R design was considered superior, it still came under criticism, particularly for the poor placement of, and lack of protection for, the secondary armament.

=== General characteristics ===
The Delawares were significantly more powerful than their predecessors, the South Carolina-class, and are mentioned by Conway's All the World's Fighting Ships as the first to match the standard set by the British with Dreadnought. This was due in large part to the elimination of Congressional limits on the size of new battleships; the only restriction the Congress placed on their design was that the cost of hull and machinery could not exceed 6 million USD. The Delaware-class ships were also significantly larger than the South Carolinas. They were 510 ft (155 m) long at the waterline and 518 ft 9 in (158 m) long overall. By comparison, the South Carolina-class ships were 452 ft 9 in (138 m) long overall. The Delawares had a beam of 85 ft 3 in (26 m) and a draft of 27 ft 3 in (8 m); the South Carolinas measurements were 80 ft 3 in (24 m) and 24 ft 6 in (7 m), respectively. The Delaware-class ships displaced 20,380 long tons (20,707 t) at standard displacement and 22,060 long tons (22,414 t) at full load, while the South Carolinas displaced 16,000 long tons (16,257 t) at standard displacement and 17,617 long tons (17,900 t) at full load. Their bows had an early example of bulbous forefeet.

=== Propulsion ===
For reasons including expected hostilities with Japan, requiring travel across the Pacific Ocean, long operational range was a recurrent theme in all US battleship designs. As an experiment, these ships received different powerplants. Delaware received triple-expansion reciprocating engines, while North Dakota was fitted with Curtiss direct drive steam turbine engines. Both ships had 14 Babcock & Wilcox boilers, both original power plants were rated at 25,000 shp (18,642 kW); and both ships were capable of reaching 21 knots. Chief Constructor Washington L. Capps predicted North Dakota would have a 25 percent shorter radius than Delaware at 16 knots and 45 percent less at 14 knots, based on tank tests and the known performance of steam turbines at that time. This estimate was proved true during the ships' trial runs in 1909. Also, because Delaware's engine bearings were equipped with forced lubrication instead of a gravity-fed system, she was able to steam at full speed for 24 hours without any need for engine repair. This would normally have been unthinkable as reciprocating engines were known generally to shake themselves apart if run at full power for long. However, this penchant for reliability came under question in the late 1930s as battleships with reciprocating engines performed poorly in the Pacific. By 1917, more powerful and efficient geared turbines had been installed in North Dakota to replace her Curtiss turbines. These provided 31,300 shp (23,340 kW) horsepower, some 6,000 shp (4,474 kW) greater than her original engines.

=== Armament ===
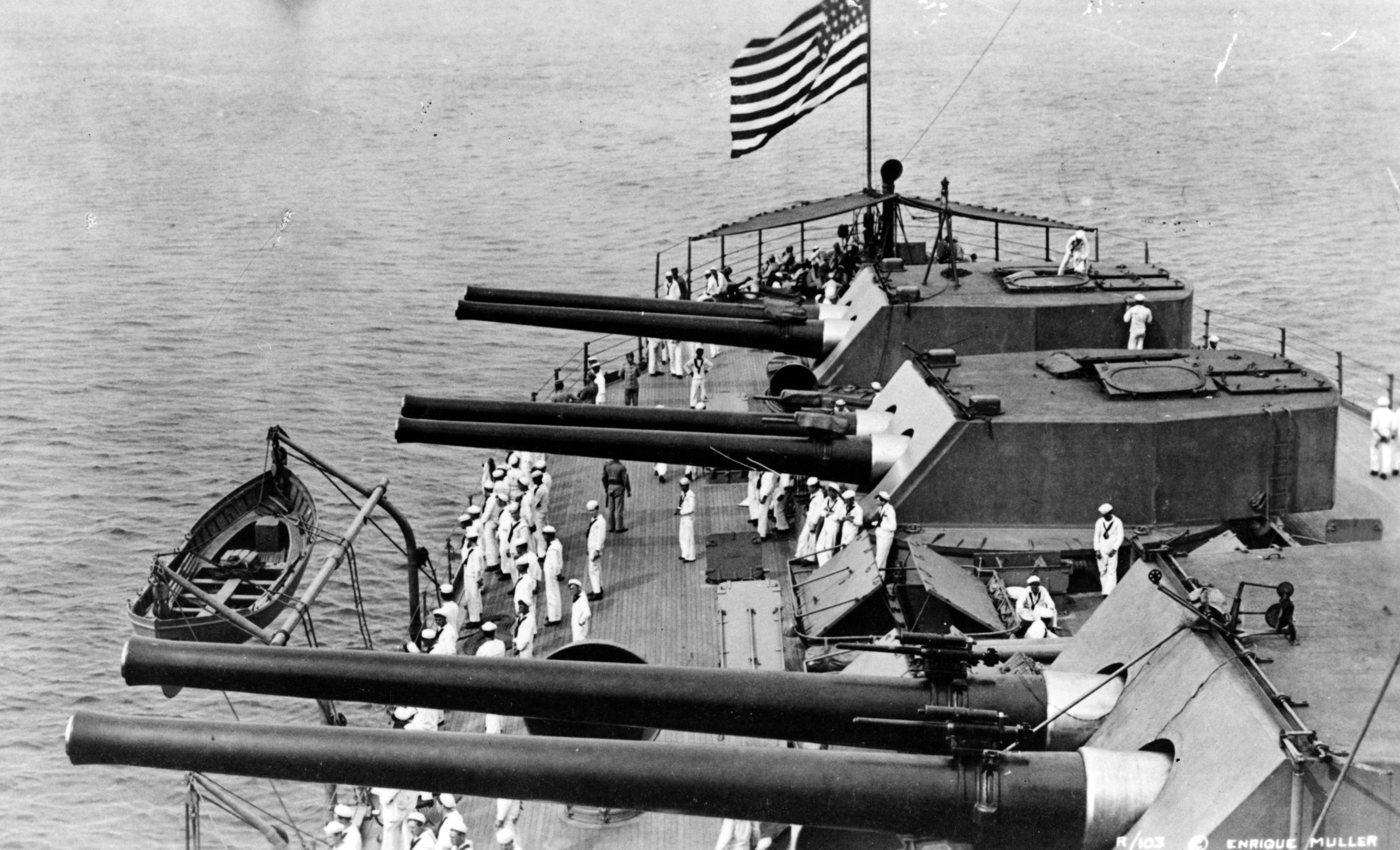
The three aft 12 inch gun turrets on USS Delaware

==== Main guns ====
The Delaware-class ships were armed with ten 12-inch/45 caliber Mark 5 guns in five twin gun turrets; this was an addition of two guns compared to the preceding South Carolinas. The gun housings were the Mark 7 type, and they allowed for depression to −5 degrees and elevation to 15 degrees. The guns had a rate of fire of 2 to 3 rounds per minute. They fired 870 lb (395 kg) shells, of either armor-piercing (AP) or Common types, though the Common type was obsolete by 1915 and put out of production. The propellant charge was 310 lb (141 kg) in silk bags, and provided a muzzle velocity of 2,700 ft/s (823 m/s). The guns were expected to fire 175 rounds before the barrels would require replacement. The two ships carried 100 shells per gun, or 1,000 rounds in total. At 15 degrees elevation, the guns could hit targets out to approximately 20,000 yd (18,288 m).

Two turrets were mounted fore in a superfiring pair, while the other three were mounted aft of the main superstructure, all on the centerline. The placement of the rear gun turrets proved problematic. Capps placed the rear superfiring turret, Number 3, closest amidships. Since it represented the greatest weight borne by the ship's structure due to its tall barbette, this placement would allow it support by the greatest amount of underwater volume available. The other two rear turrets, Numbers 4 and 5, were placed level and back to back. This arrangement was detrimental in two ways. First, Number 3 could not fire astern with Number 4 trained forward, which left only the two 12" guns of Number 5 to do so. Second, because the engine room was situated between Numbers 3 and 4, steam lines ran from the boiler rooms amidships around the ammunition magazine for Number 3 turret to the engine room. These lines, it was later found, had the potential to heat the powder in the magazine and degrade its ballistics. This design flaw was also prevalent in several British dreadnoughts but was considered inescapable by naval designers on structural grounds.

Another challenge with the main armament was that its weight, 437 long tons (444 t) per turret, which had to be spread over much of the hull, led to increased stress on the structure. The closer the weight of the heavy guns to the ends, the greater the stress and risk for structural failure due to metal fatigue. High speed required fine ends, which were not especially buoyant, and the amount of space needed amidships for machinery precluded moving the main turrets further inboard. Not having to worry about a displacement limit allowed Capps the option of deepening the hull, which helped to some extent. He added a forecastle to allow for better seakeeping and to make room for officers' quarters and restored the full height of the hull aft. The problem itself, however, remained.

==== Secondary guns ====
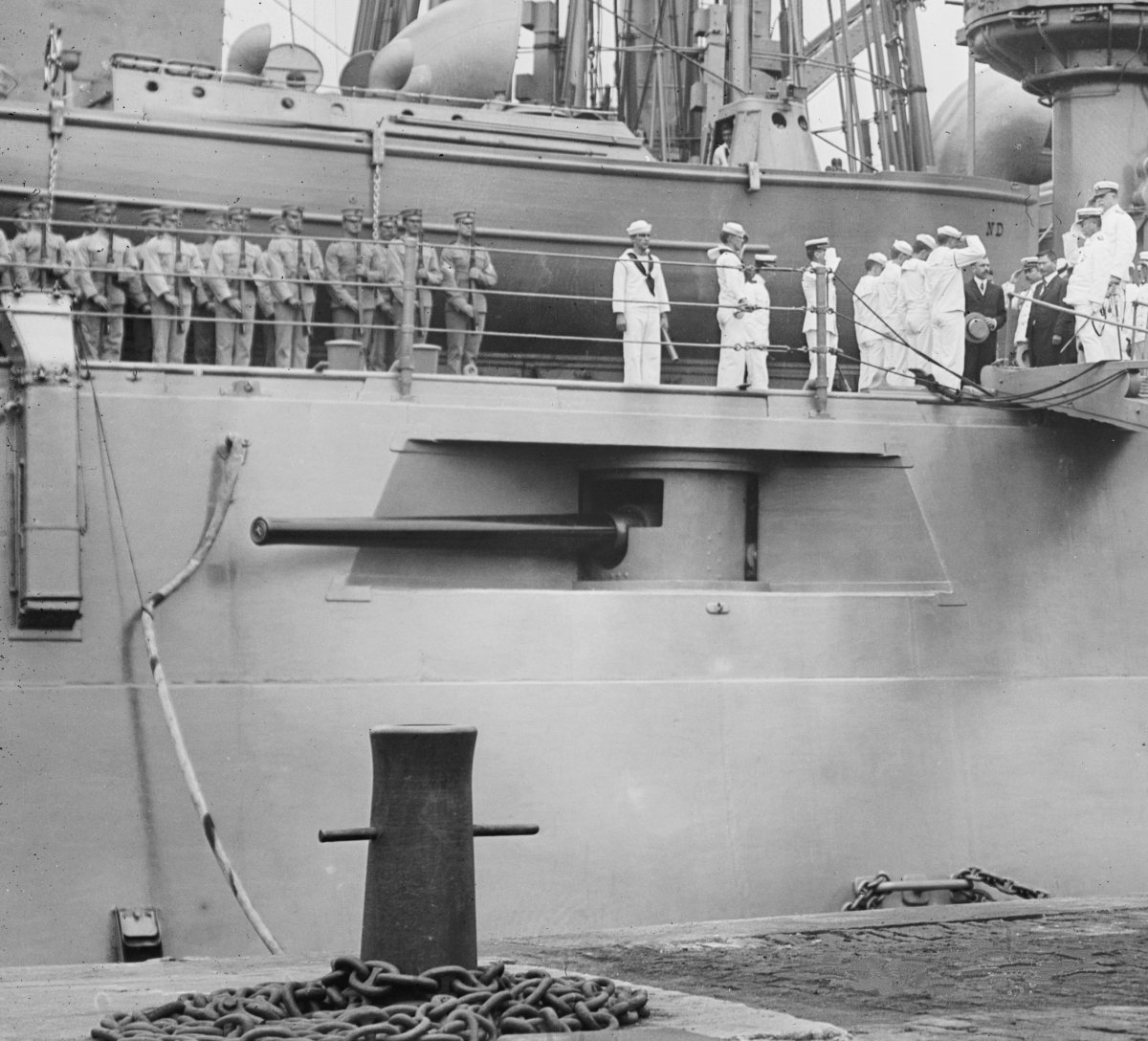
Casemate mounted 5"/50 caliber gun on USS North Dakota

The Naval War College in its 1905 Newport Summer Conference considered the 3-inch (76 mm) guns fitted to the South Carolina class too light for effective anti-torpedo-boat defense. A committee on this issue formed during the conference suggested that a gun with a high velocity and flat trajectory would work best—one powerful enough to smash an attacking vessel yet light enough for easy handling and rapid firing. For this purpose, the committee found 5-inch guns appeared best suited. During the Delawares' design, C&R considered 6-inch (152 mm) guns but concerns voiced by the Naval War College about the lack of heavy splinter protection for these guns and smoke uptakes led to an adaption of 5-inch /50 caliber guns to balance the increase in armor weight.

The Delawares mounted fourteen 5-inch/50 caliber Mark 6 guns, two forward on the main deck, 10 in casemates on the side and two aft on the main deck abeam No. 5 turret. They had a rate of fire of 6 to 8 rounds per minute. They fired three types of rounds: a "light" AP shell that weighed 50 lb (23 kg) and a "heavy" AP round that weighed 60 lb (27 kg). The third type was the Common Mark 15 shell, which also weighed 50 lb. The 50 lb shells were fired at a muzzle velocity of 3,000 ft/s (914 m/s), while the larger 60 lb shells traveled at a slightly slower 2,700 ft/s (823 m/s). The guns were emplaced on both Mark 9 and Mark 12 pedestal mounts; the Mark 9 version limited elevation to 15 degrees, while the Mark 12 allowed for up to 25 degrees. The 5-inch/50 was able to penetrate most effectively at 5,000 yd (4,572 m), which was the deciding factor in the decision to equip the Delaware class with them. The 5-inch guns were supplied with a total of 240 rounds per barrel.

While these guns were considered an improvement by the Navy over that of the South Carolinas, their placement remained problematic as even in calm water, they were extremely wet and thus difficult to man. The forward guns were moved into the superstructure after sea trials. The casemate-mounted secondary armament was one deck below the main deck and provided the majority of the complaints from shipping water from the forward positions and breaking the flow of the bow wave imparting extra drag on the design.

==== Anti-aircraft guns ====
As with the South Carolina class, these ships were fitted with two 3-inch/50 caliber anti-aircraft (AA) guns in Mark 11 mounts in 1917. The Mark 11 mount was the first 3-inch AA mounting issued by the US Navy. They had a trunnion height of 66.25 in (168 cm) compared to a height of 45 in (114 cm) for the pedestal mountings used against surface craft. This allowed them an elevation range between −10 and 85 degrees. Maximum range was 14,600 yd (13,350 m) at 43 degrees and maximum ceiling 30,400 ft (9,266 m) at 85 degrees.

==== Torpedo tubes ====
The Delawares carried two 21-inch (533 mm) torpedo tubes below the waterline. Each ship carried a total of 12 torpedoes. The Bliss-Leavitt 21-inch Mark 3 Model 1 torpedo designed for these tubes had an overall length of 196 in (5.0 m), a weight of 2,059 lb (934 kg) and propelled an explosive charge of 210 lb (95 kg) of TNT to a range of 9,000 yd (8,230 m) at a speed of 27 kn (31 mph; 50 km/h)

=== Armor ===
The armored belt ranged in thickness from 9 to 11 in (229 to 279 mm) in the more important areas of the ship. Casemated guns mounted in the hull had between 8 and 10 in (203 and 254 mm) of armor plate. The barbettes that housed the main gun turrets were armored with between 4 and 10 in (102 and 254 mm) of armor; the side portions more vulnerable to shell fire were thicker, while the front and rear sections of the barbette, which were less likely to be hit, received thinner armor to save weight. The gun turrets themselves were armored with 12 in (305 mm) of armor. The conning tower was 11.5 in (292 mm) thick. As in the designs of all early dreadnoughts, the deck armor was very thin at 1.5 in (38 mm) in most areas and 2 in (51 mm) over machinery and magazine spaces. These ships were expected to do most of their firing at ranges less than 10,000 yd (9,144 m). At such distances, deck strikes would be a rare event.

== Service history ==
Construction data
| Ship name | Hull no. | Builder | Laid down | Launched | Commissioned | Decommissioned | Fate |
|---|---|---|---|---|---|---|---|
| Delaware | BB-28 | Newport News Shipbuilding, Newport News | 11 November 1907 | 6 February 1909 | 4 April 1910 | 10 November 1923 | Broken up at Boston, 1924 |
| North Dakota | BB-29 | Fore River Shipyard, Quincy | 16 December 1907 | 10 November 1908 | 11 April 1910 | 22 November 1923 | Broken up at Baltimore, 1931 |

=== USS Delaware ===
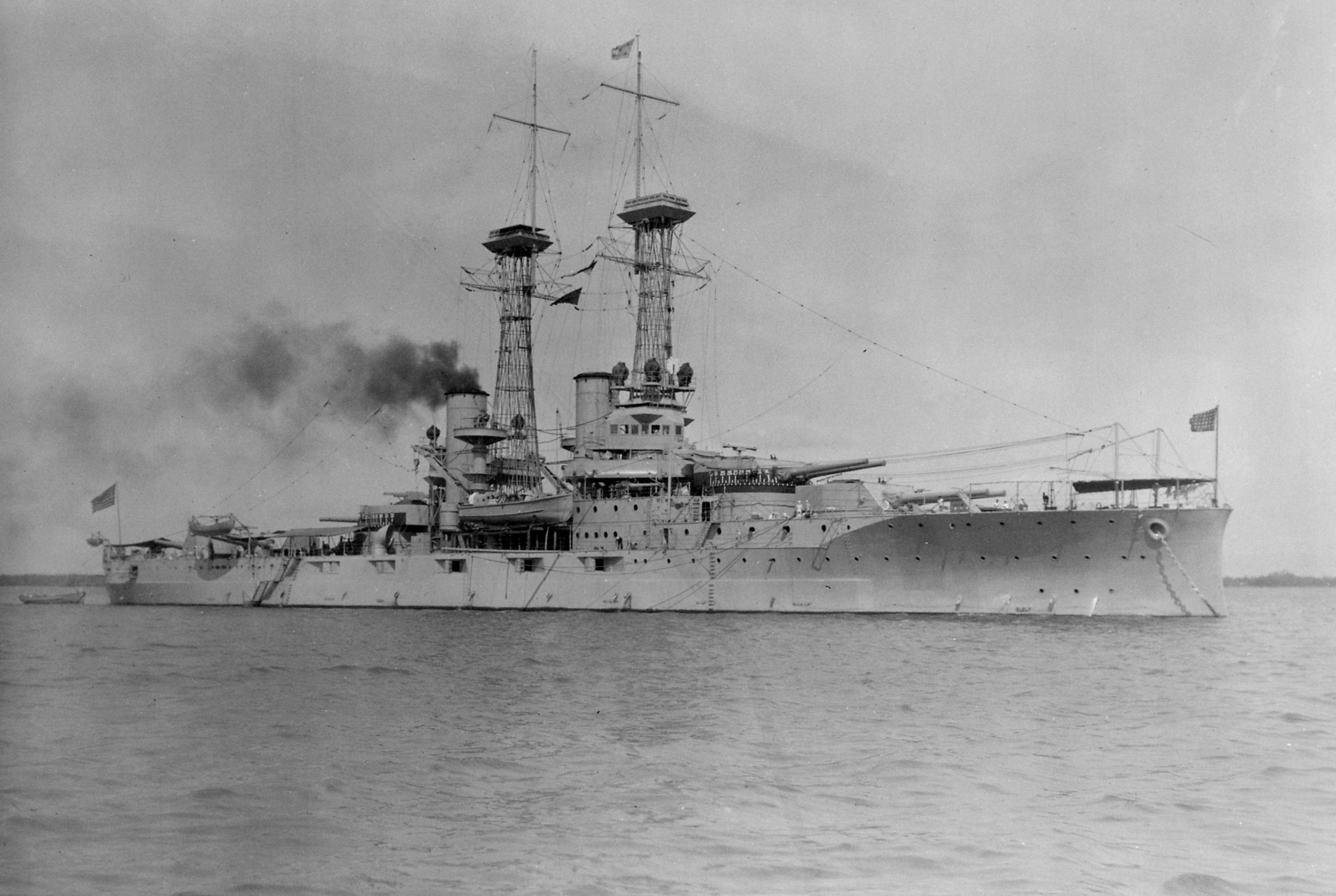
Delaware in 1920

During trials, Delaware was run at full speed for 24 hours straight to prove that her machinery could handle the stress. She was the first American battleship to achieve the feat. Late in 1910, Delaware sailed to Europe, followed by a trip to South America early in 1911. She made a further two voyages to Europe in 1912 and 1913, before returning to the US Atlantic Fleet for training exercises that were conducted in the western Atlantic and Caribbean. Delaware took part in the Second battle of Vera Cruz in April–May 1914.

When the United States declared war on Germany in April 1917, Delaware was initially tasked with readiness training off the East Coast. Late in the year, she was deployed to Europe as part of the US Navy's Battleship Division Nine, under the command of Rear Admiral Hugh Rodman. The force arrived on 7 December and was assigned to the 6th Battle Squadron of the Grand Fleet. In July 1918, Delaware was withdrawn from overseas service and returned to the United States.

In 1920, the US Navy adopted hull numbers for its ships; Delaware was assigned the hull number BB-28. Delaware made only two more cruises, both for midshipmen, under her new identification number: one in 1922 and the second in early 1923. Delaware sailed to Europe on the second trip, and stopped at a number of ports, including Gibraltar. She returned to the US in August of that year, at which point her crew was reassigned to the newer battleship Colorado. She was then taken to the Boston Navy Yard, where her armaments were removed. The ship was decommissioned in November 1923 and sold to shipbreakers in February 1924.

=== USS North Dakota ===
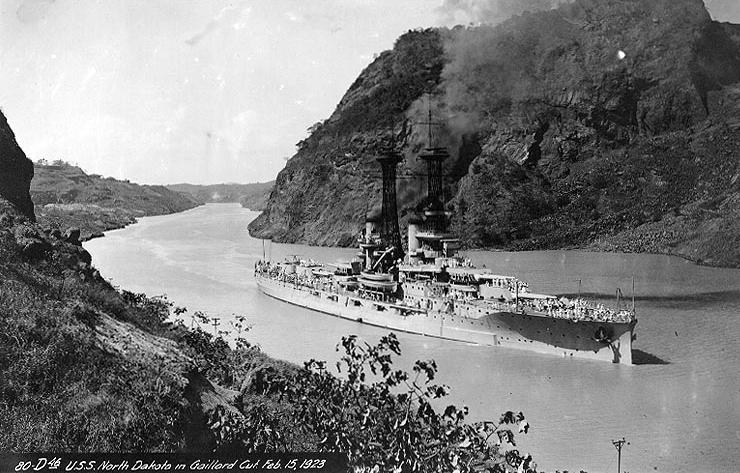
North Dakota transiting the Panama Canal

Upon commissioning, the ship was assigned to the Atlantic Fleet, alongside her sister Delaware. Her first overseas cruise came in November 1910, when she steamed across the Atlantic to visit France and Britain. North Dakota also took part in the invasion of Vera Cruz in 1914. Unlike her sister, North Dakota remained off the American coast for the duration of the United States' involvement in World War I. Hugh Rodman, the commander of the American expeditionary force, specifically requested that North Dakota be kept stateside; he felt her turbine engines were too unreliable for the ship to be deployed to a war zone. In 1917, her engines were replaced with new geared turbines, and new fire control equipment was installed.

From 1917, she was employed as a training ship for gunners and engineers. Post-war, North Dakota made a second trip to Europe, primarily to ports in the Mediterranean Sea. During the visit, the ship was tasked with the return of the remains of the Italian ambassador, Vincenzo Macchi di Cellere, who had died 20 October 1919 in Washington, DC. The ship participated in the aerial bombing demonstrations off the Virginia Capes in 1921. In 1923, a third trip to Europe, this time with midshipmen from the Naval Academy aboard. The ship stopped in Spain, Scotland, and Scandinavia.

Like her sister, she was relegated to the surplus naval forces that had to be dismantled under the Washington Naval Treaty. In November 1923, North Dakota was decommissioned; she had her armaments removed in 1924, after which she was converted into a target ship. She was redesignated as "unclassified", and served as a target until 1931, when she was scrapped.
