= 12-inch/45-caliber Mark 5 gun =

1906 American naval gun

12-inch/45-caliber Mark 5 Naval Gun
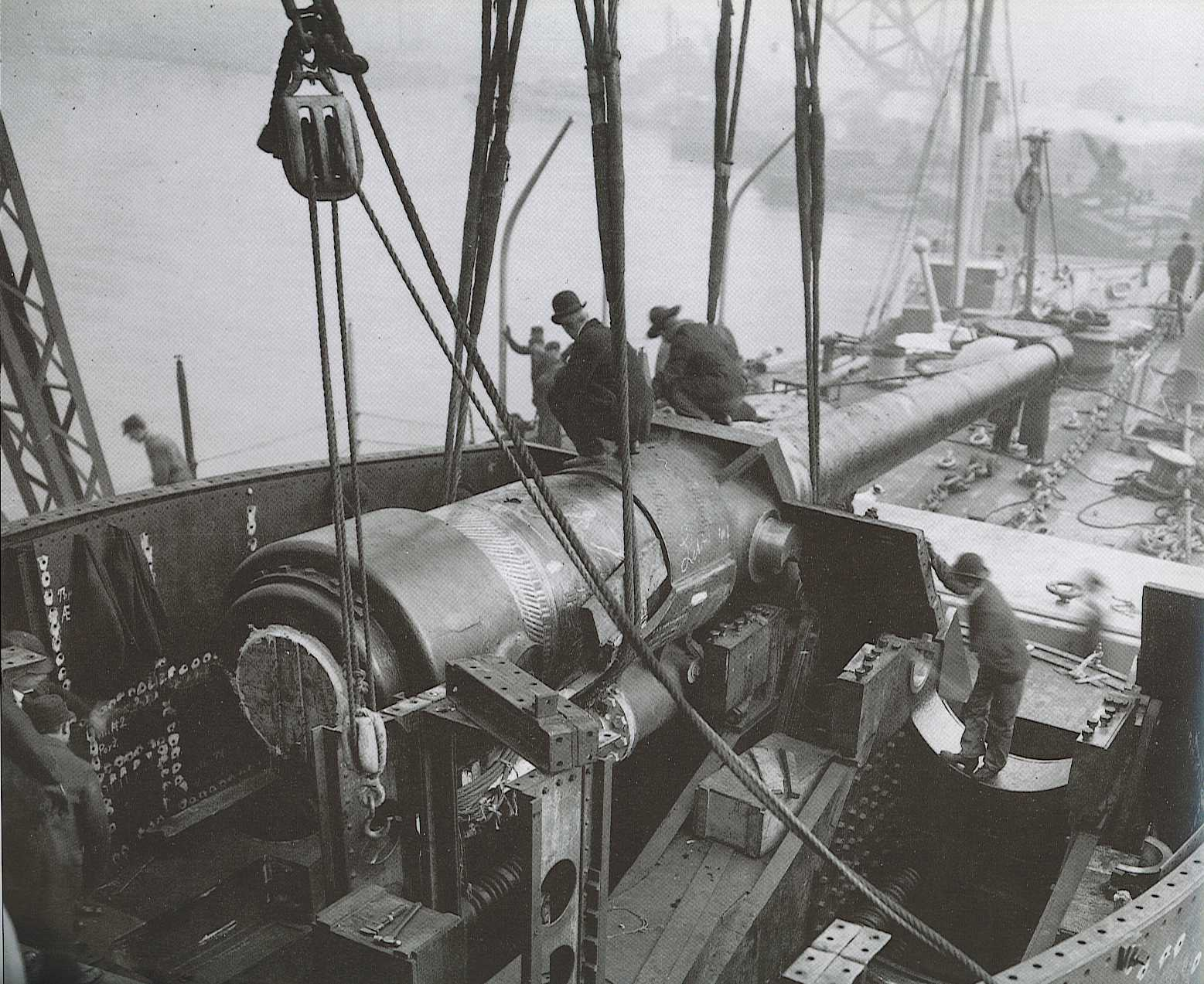
- Mark 5 gun being hoisted aboard USS Connecticut
- Type: Naval gun; Coastal defence
- Place of origin: United States

Service history
- In service: 1906–1930
- Used by: United States Navy; Greek Navy
- Wars: World War I; Russian Civil War; Greco-Turkish War; World War II

Production history
- Designer: Bureau of Ordnance
- Designed: 1903
- Manufacturer: U.S. Naval Gun Factory

Specifications
- Mass: 53 short tons (48 t)
- Barrel length: 45 ft 0 in (13.72 m) bore (45 calibers)
- Shell: 870 lb (390 kg)
- Caliber: 12 in (305 mm)
- Elevation: −5° to +15°
- Rate of fire: 2–3 rpm
- Muzzle velocity: 2,700 ft/s (820 m/s)
- Effective firing range: 20,000 yd (18,288 m) at 15° elevation; 30,000 yd (27,432 m) at 47° elevation (as coastal artillery)

The 12-inch/45-caliber Mark 5 gun was an American naval gun that first entered service in 1906. Initially designed for use with the Connecticut-class of pre-dreadnought battleships, the Mark 5 continued in service aboard the first generation of American dreadnoughts.

== Design and development ==
The 12-inch (305 mm)/45-caliber Mark 5 naval gun was designed as an incremental improvement upon the preceding American naval gun, the 12-inch/40-caliber gun Mark 4. As such, it was a very similar weapon, having been lengthened by 5 calibers to allow for improved muzzle velocity, range, and penetrating power. Designed to the specifications of the Bureau of Ordnance, the Mark 5 was constructed at the U.S. Naval Gun Factory in Washington, D.C.

== Measurements and capabilities ==
The Mark 5 weighed 53 short tons (48 t) and was capable of firing 2 to 3 times a minute. At maximum elevation of 15° it could fire an 870 lb (390 kg) shell approximately 20,000 yd (18,000 m). However, this range was largely academic at the time the gun was initially designed, as no rangefinding techniques had yet been developed capable of accurately firing beyond about 10,000 yd (9,100 m). With an initial muzzle velocity of 2,700 ft/s (820 m/s), the gun had a barrel life of 175 rounds, and was capable of firing either armor-piercing or common projectiles.

As designed, the Mark 5 was capable of penetrating 16.6 in (420 mm) of Harvey plated side armor at 6,000 yd (5,500 m), 12.2 in (310 mm) at 9,000 yd (8,200 m), and 9.9 in (250 mm) at 12,000 yd (11,000 m). By comparison the 12-inch/40-caliber Mark 4 it replaced could only penetrate 14.6 in (370 mm), 11.6 in (290 mm), and 9.4 in (240 mm) at those distances, respectively.

== Naval service ==
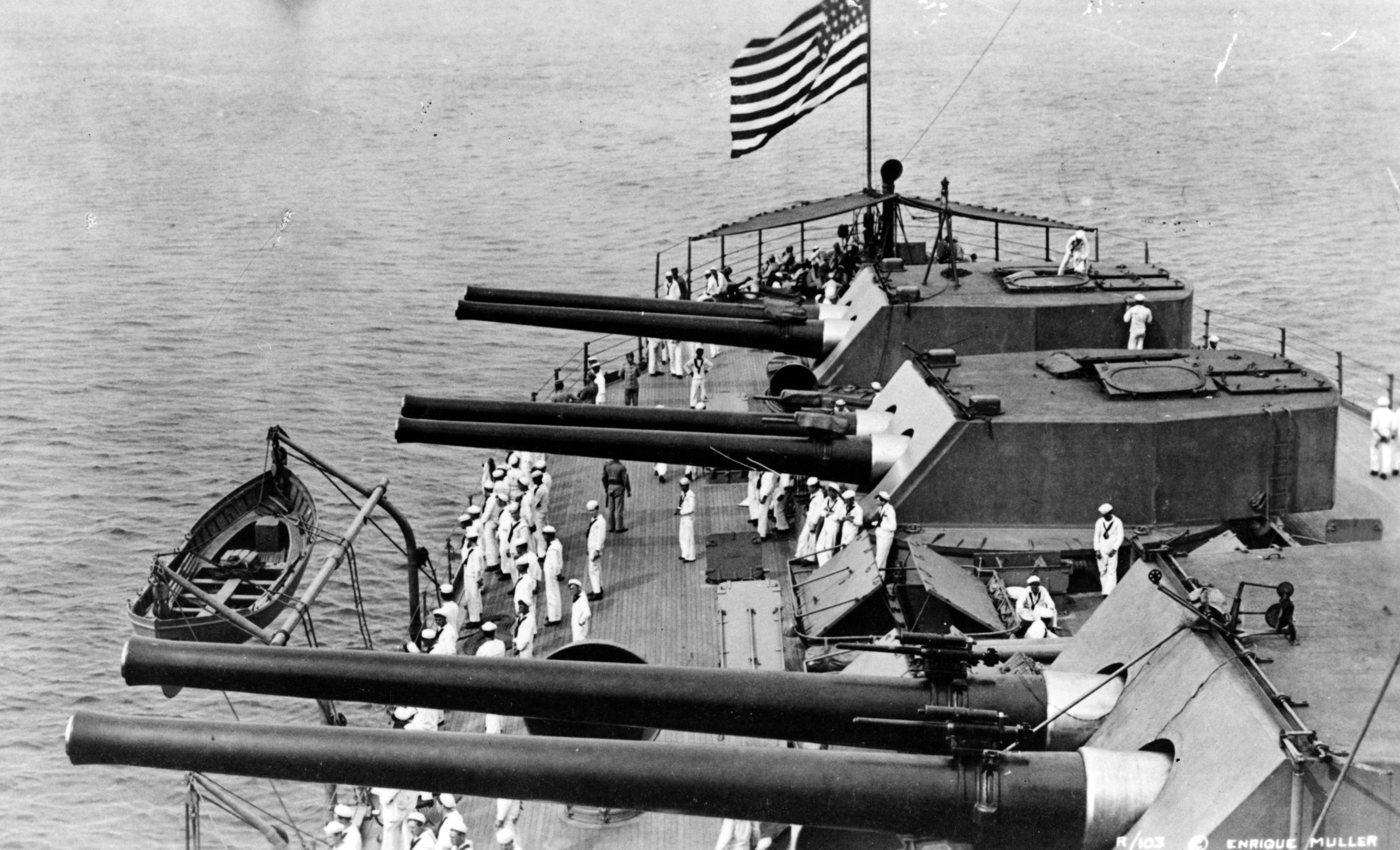
After six Mark 5 guns aboard USS Delaware, c. 1913.

The Mark 5 entered service in 1906 and remained the primary battleship gun for all American battleships commissioned before 1912, at which point it was replaced by the 12"/50-caliber Mark 7. All told, the Mark 5 would arm 14 battleships of five different classes, making it the most-used main gun in American battleship history. Despite this distinction, the only Mark 5 guns ever to be fired in anger were actually in Greek, and not American, service. The ex-Mississippi-class battleships Kilkis and Lemnos, sold to the Royal Hellenic Navy in 1914, fought in both the Allied Intervention in the Russian Civil War, and the Greco-Turkish War. Though during World War I the Mark 5 would cross the Atlantic for duty aboard two of the American battleships serving in the 6th Battle Squadron of the Grand Fleet, it was never fired in any engagement, as no battles were fought with the German High Seas Fleet in 1918.

The five classes armed with the Mark 5 were:

- Connecticut-class
- Mississippi-class
- South Carolina-class
- Delaware-class
- Florida-class

In American service, the Mark 5 remained afloat (albeit in dwindling numbers) until 1930, when the last guns were removed from the Floridas in compliance with the terms of the London Naval Treaty.

=== Survivor ===
A Mark 5 Mod 8 gun is displayed at Fort Hamilton in Brooklyn, New York, representative of the general type of coast artillery guns the fort had.

== Incident ==
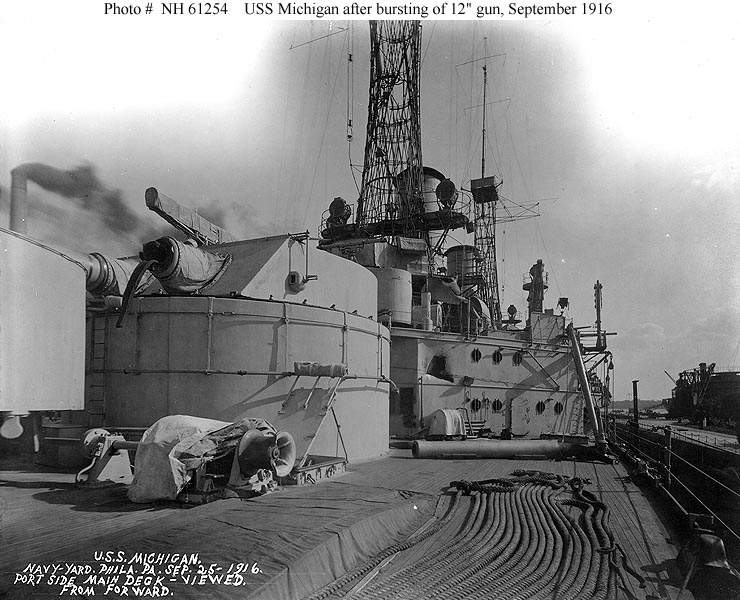
View looking aft along the port side, showing barrel of burst 12-inch gun on deck with the gun's rear portion in Turret # 2. Photographed at the Philadelphia Navy Yard, Pennsylvania, 25 September 1916. Note holes in superstructure and in the "cage" foremast caused by this accident.

During the summer of 1916, Michigan blew out her left hand gun in turret No. 2 during target practice. After an investigation of South Carolina's guns it was discovered that copper deposits from the driving bands on the projectiles had narrowed the bores of the barrel enough that it caused the projectiles to slow down. This problem, known as "copper choke", allowed the pressure in the barrel to increase to dangerous levels. Lapping heads, to remove these deposits, were issued for all guns 12-inch and larger throughout the fleet. The lapping heads were later replaced by wire and pissaba brushes.

== Coastal artillery ==
Following the signing of the Washington Naval Treaty in 1922, many of the Mark 5 guns in service were removed from sea duty and transferred to the U.S. Army for use as coastal artillery. In this capacity, the maximum range of the Mark 5 increased to 30,000 yd (27,000 m), due to the greater elevation that was possible. These guns were not deployed by the US Army, and some were sold to Brazil, where they might still be in use. In Greek service, the guns removed from Lemnos were emplaced on the island of Aegina, where they helped to defend the approaches to the port of Athens.

== See also ==
=== Weapons of comparable role, performance and era ===
- 305mm/45 Modèle 1906 gun – French equivalent
- BL 12-inch Mk X naval gun – British equivalent
- EOC 12-inch 45-calibre naval gun ("41st Year Type") – British-manufactured Japanese equivalent
