= Harley H. Christy =

Harley Hannibal Christy
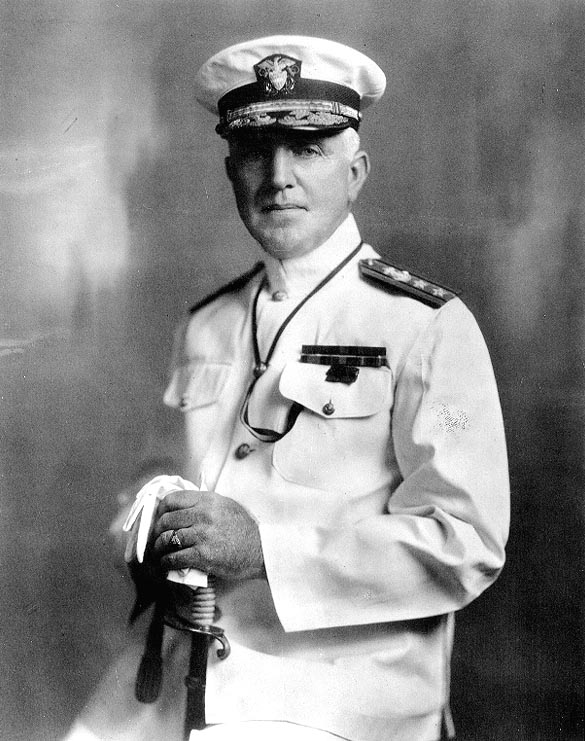
- Vice Admiral Harley H. Christy
- Born: September 18, 1870; Circleville, Ohio
- Died: June 4, 1950 (aged 79); Bethesda, Maryland
- Burial place: United States Naval Academy Cemetery
- Military career
- Allegiance: United States of America
- Branch: United States Navy
- Service years: 1887–1934
- Rank: Vice admiral
- Commands: Chester; Brooklyn; Salem; Kearsarge; Reina Mercedes; Minneapolis; San Diego; Wyoming; California
- Conflicts: Spanish–American War; World War I
- Awards: Distinguished Service Medal

Vice Admiral Harley Hannibal Christy (18 September 1870 – 4 June 1950) served in the United States Navy during the Spanish–American War and World War I.

== Biography ==
Christy was born in Circleville, Ohio and raised in Ashville, Ohio. He graduated from the U.S. Naval Academy in 1891.

=== Early career ===
In April 1898, at the start of the Spanish–American War, Christy was serving as an ensign aboard the cruiser Detroit when she captured the ocean liner Catalina off Havana. The 1,000-ton ship was carrying a general cargo from New Orleans to Barcelona, and was valued at $600,000. A prize crew, commanded by Christy, of sixteen men from Detroit and New York, took the vessel to Key West.

Christy was in command of two small gunboats during 1902, and was the Executive Officer of the armored cruiser North Carolina (ACR-12) in 1910.

Christy was promoted from lieutenant commander to commander on 3 July 1911, and was commanding officer of the Chester, Brooklyn, Salem and Kearsarge between the years 1912-1915.

Christy commanded the Reina Mercedes, the station ship at Annapolis, Maryland, when he was placed in charge of vessels for the Army Transport, at the Naval Academy, between 9 September 1915 and 5 July 1917.

=== World War I ===
Christy was promoted to captain on 23 May 1917, and commanded the protected cruiser Minneapolis from 7 July to 17 August. Two days later, on 19 August, Christy was placed in command of the armored cruiser San Diego, engaged in transporting and escorting troops and supplies to European ports.

At 11:05 on the morning of 19 July 1918 San Diego hit a mine laid by the German U-boat U-156 off Fire Island, New York. The crew abandoned ship, and the San Diego rolled over and sank within half an hour. Six men were killed and three injured.

After the loss of the San Diego Christy commanded the Wyoming from 29 September 1918 to 22 September 1919 during North Sea operations with the British Grand Fleet as part of Battleship Division Nine.

Christy was awarded the Distinguished Service Medal for his service while in command of San Diego and Wyoming.

=== Post-war ===
Christy retired from active duty in October 1934, and in January 1950 was advanced to the rank of vice admiral on the Retired List in honor of his combat awards.

Christy died on 4 June 1950, and is buried at the United States Naval Academy Cemetery in Annapolis, Maryland.

== Error ==
The US Navy Official Biography cites Christy as Commanding Officer of California (BB-44) from 1919 to 1924. This should read from 1923 to 1924.
