= USS Wyoming (BB-32) =

Dreadnought battleship of the United States Navy

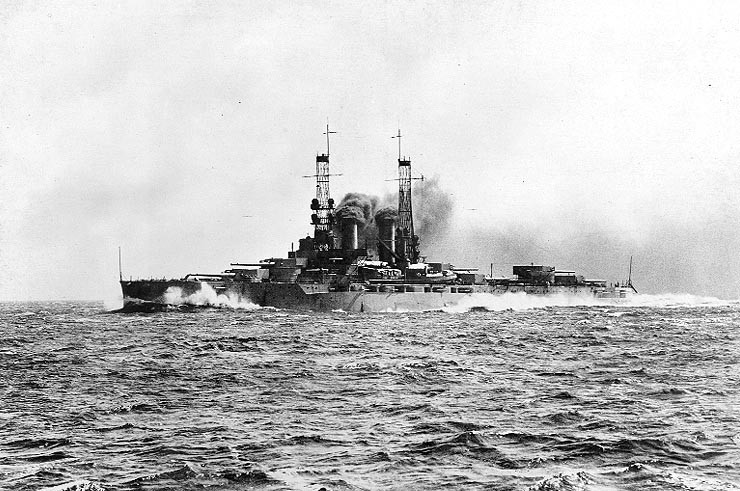
- Wyoming, c. 1912–13

History

United States
- Name: Wyoming
- Namesake: Wyoming
- Ordered: 3 March 1909
- Builder: William Cramp & Sons, Philadelphia
- Yard number: 365
- Laid down: 9 February 1910
- Launched: 25 May 1911
- Commissioned: 25 September 1912
- Decommissioned: 1 August 1947
- Stricken: 16 December 1947
- Fate: Sold for scrap, 30 October 1947

General characteristics
- Class & type: Wyoming-class battleship
- Displacement: Normal: 26,000 long tons (26,000 t); Full load: 27,243 long tons (27,680 t)
- Length: 562 ft (171 m) (overall); 554 ft (169 m) (waterline)
- Beam: 93 ft 3 in (28.42 m)
- Draft: 28 ft 6 in (8.69 m) (mean); 29 ft 7 in (9.02 m) (max)
- Installed power: 12 × Babcock & Wilcox coal-fired water-tube boilers; 28,000 shp (20,880 kW)
- Propulsion: 4 × Parsons steam turbines; 4 × screw propellers
- Speed: 20.5 kn (38.0 km/h; 23.6 mph) (design); 21.22 kn (39.30 km/h; 24.42 mph) (trials)
- Range: 8,000 nmi (15,000 km; 9,200 mi) at 10 kn (19 km/h; 12 mph)
- Complement: 1,063 officers and enlisted
- Armament: 12 × 12 in (305 mm)/50 caliber Mark 7 guns; 21 × 5 in (127 mm)/51 cal guns; 4 × 3-pounder 47 mm (1.85 in)/40 cal saluting guns; 2 × 21 in (533 mm) torpedo tubes (submerged)
- Armor: Belt: 5–11 in (127–279 mm); Turret face: 12 in (305 mm); Barbettes: 11 in; Conning tower: 11.5 in (292 mm); Decks: 1.5–2.5 in (38–64 mm)

General characteristics 1925-27 refit
- Displacement: Normal: 26,100 long tons (26,500 t); Full load: 31,000 long tons (31,000 t)
- Draft: 32 ft (9.8 m) (max)
- Installed power: 4 × White-Forster oil-fired boilers
- Armament: 12 × 12 in/50 caliber Mark 7 guns; 16 × 5 in/51 caliber guns (reduced in 1919); 4 × 3-pounder saluting guns; 2 × 3 in (76 mm)/50 caliber AA guns (added in 1919)
- Aircraft carried: 3 × floatplanes
- Aviation facilities: 1 × catapult (fitted on Turret 3)

General characteristics 1931 refit
- Displacement: Normal: 26000 LT; Full load: 27243 LT
- Draft: 28 ft 6 in (mean); 29 ft 7 in (max)
- Armament: 6 × 12 in/50 caliber Mark 7 guns (turrets 3, 4, and 5 removed); 16 × 5 in/51 caliber guns; 4 × 3-pounder saluting guns; 2 × 3 in/50 caliber AA guns
- Aircraft carried: Aircraft removed
- Aviation facilities: Catapult removed

General characteristics 1944 refit
- Armament: Remaining 12 in guns removed; 10 × 5 in/38 caliber dual-purpose guns; 4 × 3 in/50 caliber AA guns; 4 × 3-pounder saluting guns; 6 × 40 mm Bofors guns (3 × 2); 4 × 20 mm Oerlikon guns (2 × 2); 2 × Mk 17 rocket launchers

USS Wyoming (BB-32) was the lead ship of her class of dreadnought battleships and was the third ship of the United States Navy named Wyoming, although she was only the second named in honor of the 44th state. (Note: The first Wyoming, USS Wyoming (1859), was named in honor of the Wyoming Valley in eastern Pennsylvania, nine years before the creation of the Wyoming Territory, which later became the state.) Wyoming was laid down at the William Cramp & Sons in Philadelphia in February 1910, was launched in May 1911, and was completed in September 1912. She was armed with a main battery of twelve 12-inch (305 mm) guns and capable of a top speed of 20.5 kn (38.0 km/h; 23.6 mph).

During the First World War, she was part of the Battleship Division Nine, which was attached to the British Grand Fleet as the 6th Battle Squadron. During the war, she was primarily tasked with patrolling in the North Sea and escorting convoys to Norway. She served in both the Atlantic and Pacific Fleets throughout the 1920s, and in 1931–1932, she was converted into a training ship according to the terms of the London Naval Treaty of 1930.

Wyoming served as a training ship throughout the 1930s, and in November 1941, she became a gunnery ship. She operated primarily in the Chesapeake Bay area, which earned her the nickname "Chesapeake Raider". In this capacity, she trained some 35,000 gunners for the hugely expanded US Navy during World War II. She continued in this duty until 1947, when she was decommissioned on 1 August and subsequently sold for scrap; she was broken up in New York starting in December 1947.

== Design ==
Wyoming was 562 ft (171 m) long overall and had a beam of 93 ft 3 in (28 m) and a draft of 28 ft 6 in (9 m). She displaced 26,000 long tons (26,417 t) as designed and up to 27,243 long tons (27,680 t) at full load. The ship was powered by four-shaft Parsons steam turbines and twelve coal-fired Babcock & Wilcox boilers rated at 28,000 shp (21,000 kW), generating a top speed of 20.5 kn (38.0 km/h; 23.6 mph). The ship had a cruising range of 8,000 nmi (15,000 km; 9,200 mi) at a speed of 10 kn (19 km/h; 12 mph).

The ship was armed with a main battery of twelve 12-inch/50 caliber Mark 7 (Note: /50 refers to the length of the gun in terms of calibers. A /50 gun is 50 times long as it is in bore diameter.) guns in six Mark 9 twin gun turrets on the centerline, two of which were placed in a superfiring pair forward. The other four turrets were placed aft of the superstructure in two superfiring pairs. The secondary battery consisted of twenty-one 5-inch (127 mm)/51 caliber guns mounted in casemates along the side of the hull. The main armored belt was 11 in (279 mm) thick, while the gun turrets had 12 in (305 mm) thick faces. The conning tower had 11.5 in (292 mm) thick sides.

=== Modifications ===
In 1925, Wyoming was modernized in the Philadelphia Navy Yard. Her displacement increased significantly, to 26,066 long tons (26,484 t) standard and 30,610 long tons (31,100 t) full load. Her beam was widened to 106 ft (32 m), primarily from the installation of anti-torpedo bulges, and draft increased to 29 ft 11.75 in (9 m). Her twelve coal-fired boilers were replaced with four White-Forster oil-fired boilers that had been intended for the ships cancelled under the terms of the Washington Naval Treaty; performance remained the same as the older boilers. The ship's deck armor was strengthened by the addition of 3.5 in (89 mm) of armor to the second deck between the end barbettes, plus 1.75 in (44 mm) of armor on the third deck on the bow and stern. The deck armor over the engines and boilers was increased by 0.75 in (19 mm) and 1.25 in (32 mm), respectively. Five of the 5-inch guns were removed and eight 3-inch (76 mm)/50 caliber anti-aircraft guns were installed. The mainmast was removed to provide space for an aircraft catapult mounted on the Number 3 turret amidships.

== Service history ==
Wyoming was laid down at the William Cramp & Sons shipyard in Philadelphia on 9 February 1910, and was launched on 25 May 1911. She was completed a year and four months later, on 25 September 1912. After her commissioning, the final fitting-out work was completed at the New York Navy Yard over the next three months. She then proceeded to join the rest of the fleet at Hampton Roads on 30 December, where she became the flagship of Rear Admiral Charles J. Badger, the commander of the Atlantic Fleet. Wyoming left Hampton Roads on 6 January 1913, bound for the Caribbean. She visited the Panama Canal, which was nearing completion, and then participated in fleet exercises off Cuba. The ship was back in port in Chesapeake Bay on 4 March.

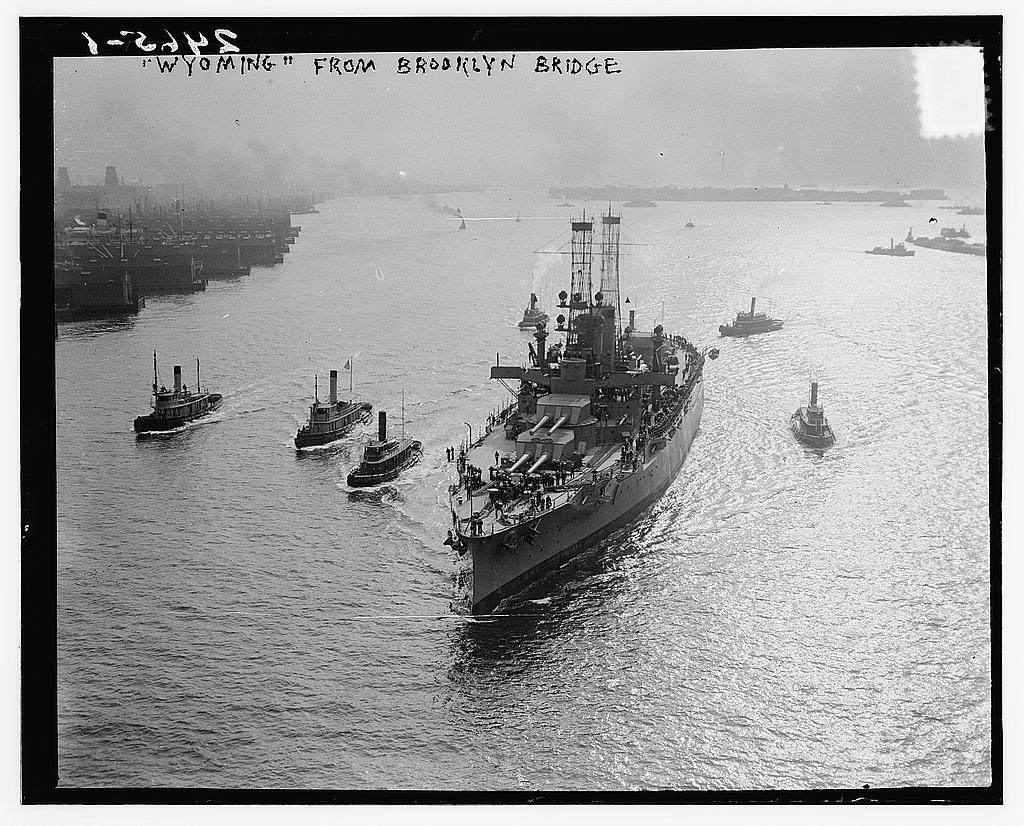
Wyoming steaming in the East River in 1912

Wyoming then took part in gunnery drills off the Virginia Capes, and on 18 April, entered drydock at the New York Navy Yard for some repairs, which lasted until 7 May. She joined the rest of the fleet for maneuvers off Block Island that lasted from 7–24 May. During the maneuvers, the ship's machinery proved troublesome, which necessitated repairs at Newport from 9–19 May. At the end of the month, she was in New York harbor, to participate in the ceremonies for the dedication of the monument to the armored cruiser Maine, which had been destroyed in Havana harbor on 15 February 1898. On 4 June, Wyoming steamed to Annapolis, where she took on a crew of naval cadets from the Naval Academy for a summer midshipman cruise.

After returning the midshipmen to Annapolis on 24–25 August, Wyoming took part in gunnery and torpedo training over the next few weeks. On 16 September, she returned to New York for repairs, which lasted until 2 October. She then ran full–power sea trials before proceeding to the Virginia Capes, where she participated in another round of fleet maneuvers. Next, she departed for a European goodwill cruise on 26 October. She toured the Mediterranean Sea, stopping in Valletta, Malta, Naples, Italy, and Villefranche, France. She departed France on 30 November, and arrived in New York on 15 December. There, she went into dock at the New York Navy Yard for periodic repairs, which lasted until January 1914. On the 6th, Wyoming left for Hampton Roads, where she took on coal in preparation for the annual fleet maneuvers in the Caribbean.

The exercises lasted from 26 January to 15 March, and the fleet was based in Guantanamo Bay Naval Base in Cuba. Wyoming and the rest of the fleet then proceeded to Tangier Sound for additional training, including gunnery drills. On 3 April, Wyoming left the fleet for an overhaul in New York, which lasted until 9 May. She then returned to Hampton Roads, where she took on a contingent of troops and ferried them to Veracruz, arriving on 18 May. The US had intervened in the Mexican Revolution and occupied Veracruz to safeguard American citizens there. Wyoming cruised off Veracruz into the Autumn of 1914, at which point she returned to the Virginia Capes for exercises. On 6 October, she entered New York for repairs; this work lasted until 17 January 1915.

Wyoming then proceeded to Hampton Roads, and then to Cuba, where she joined the fleet for the annual maneuvers off Cuba. These lasted until April, when she returned to the US. She participated in more exercises off Block Island over the next several months, and on 20 December, she returned to New York for another overhaul. On 6 January 1916, she emerged from dry dock, and then proceeded to the Caribbean. On 16 January, she reached Culebra, Puerto Rico, then visited Port-au-Prince, Haiti on 27 January. She entered port at Guantanamo the next day, and took part in fleet maneuvers until 10 April, after which she returned to New York. Another round of dockyard work took place from 16 April to 26 June. After returning to service, Wyoming took part in more maneuvers off the Virginia Capes for the remainder of the year. She left New York on 9 January 1917, bound for Cuban waters for exercises that lasted through mid-March. She left Cuba on 27 March, and was cruising off Yorktown, Virginia, when the US declared war on Germany on 6 April, formally entering World War I.

=== World War I ===
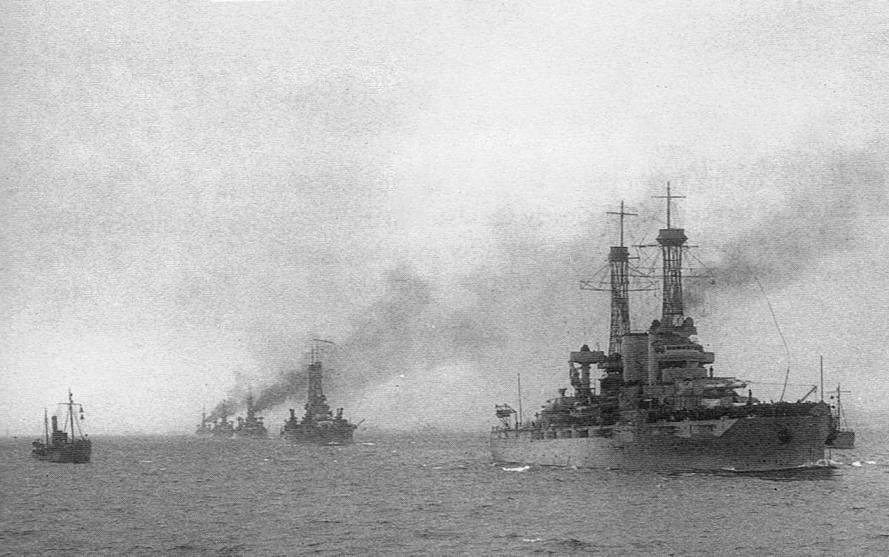
Battleship Division 9 steaming into Scapa Flow

Wyoming operated out of the Chesapeake Bay area for the next seven months, training engine-room personnel for the expanding American fleet. On 25 November, Battleship Division 9 (BatDiv 9), which at that time comprised Wyoming, New York, Delaware, and Florida, departed the US, bound for Britain. BatDiv 9 was to reinforce the British Grand Fleet at its base in Scapa Flow. The American ships reached Scapa on 7 December, where they became the 6th Battle Squadron of the Grand Fleet. The American ships drilled with their British counterparts from December 1917 to February 1918.

On 6 February, Wyoming and the other American battleships undertook their first wartime operation, to escort a convoy to Stavanger, Norway, in company with eight British destroyers. On 7 February, lookouts on several ships, including Wyoming, thought they spotted German U-boats attacking the ships with torpedoes, though these proved to be incorrect reports. The convoy successfully reached Norway two days later; the return trip to Scapa Flow took another two days. Wyoming patrolled in the North Sea for the next several months, watching for a sortie by the German High Seas Fleet. On 30 June, Wyoming and the rest of the 6th Battle Squadron covered a minelaying operation in the North Sea; the operation lasted until 2 July. During the operation, jumpy crewmen again incorrectly reported U-boat sightings, and Wyoming opened fire on the supposed targets. On the return voyage, the 6th Battle Squadron joined up with Convoy HZ40, which was returning from Norway.

On 14 October, New York collided with a U-boat and sank it. The collision nevertheless damaged her screws, which forced Rodman to transfer his flag from New York to Wyoming while the former was in dock for repair. On 21 November, after the Armistice with Germany ended the war, Wyoming and an Allied fleet of some 370 warships met the High Seas Fleet in the North Sea and escorted it into internment in Scapa Flow. On 12 December, Wyoming, now the flagship of Rear Admiral William Sims, the new BatDiv 9 commander, left Britain for France. There, she rendezvoused off Brest, France, with George Washington, which was carrying President Woodrow Wilson to the peace negotiations in Paris. Wyoming then returned to Britain two days later before departing for the US, arriving in New York on 25 December. She remained there through the new year, and on 18 January 1919, she became the flagship of BatDiv 7, flying the flag of Rear Admiral Robert Coontz.

=== Inter-war period ===
==== 1919–1924 ====
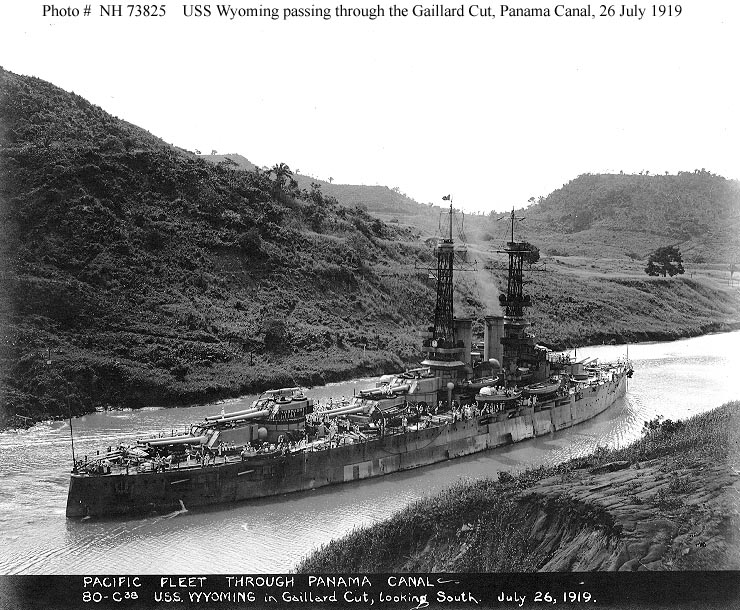
Wyoming transiting the Panama Canal on 26 July 1919

On 1 February, Wyoming steamed out of New York to join the annual fleet maneuvers off Cuba, before returning to New York on 14 April. On 12 May, she left port to help guide a group of Navy Curtiss NC flying boats as they made the first aerial transatlantic crossing. The battleship was back in port by 31 May. She then took on a crew of midshipmen for a training cruise off the Chesapeake Bay and Virginia Capes. After finishing the cruise, Wyoming entered dry dock at the Norfolk Navy Yard on 1 July for a modernization for service in the Pacific. Her secondary battery was reduced to sixteen 5-inch guns. After emerging from the shipyard, she became the flagship of BatDiv 6 of the newly designated Pacific Fleet. On 19 July, Wyoming and the rest of the Pacific Fleet departed the east coast, bound for the Pacific. The ships transited the Panama Canal later that month, and reached San Diego, California on 6 August.

On 9 August, Wyoming moved to San Pedro, where she was based for the next month. She went to the Puget Sound Navy Yard for an overhaul that lasted until 19 April 1920. On 4 May, she was back in San Pedro and resumed her normal routine of fleet maneuvers off the California coast. On 30 August, Wyoming left California for Hawaii, where she participated in more training exercises through September. She then returned to San Diego on 8 October for more maneuvers off the west coast. The ship left San Francisco on 5 January 1921 for a cruise to Central and South American waters; the trip culminated in Valparaíso, Chile, where she was reviewed by the President of Chile Arturo Alessandri Palma on 8 February. Wyoming then returned north, arriving in Puget Sound for repairs on 18 March.

On 2 August, Wyoming was in Balboa in the Canal Zone, where she picked up Rear Admiral Rodman and a commission traveling from Peru back to New York. She arrived in New York on 19 August and rejoined the Atlantic Fleet. There, she became the flagship of Admiral Hilary P. Jones, the commander of the Atlantic Fleet. Wyoming spent the next three and a half years on the normal routine of winter fleet exercises off Cuba, followed by summer maneuvers off the east coast of the US. Throughout the period, she served as the flagship of Vice Admirals John McDonald, Newton McCully, and Josiah McKean in the Scouting Fleet. In the summer of 1924, she conducted a midshipman training cruise to Europe, and stopped in Torbay, Great Britain, Rotterdam in the Netherlands, Gibraltar, and the Azores. In January and February 1924, the Navy conducted Fleet Problem II, III, and IV concurrently. During the FP III maneuvers, Wyoming, her sister Arkansas, and the two Florida-class battleships stood in for the new Colorado-class battleships. During the FP IV portion of the maneuvers, Wyoming served in the "Blue" force, which represented the US Navy. She was attacked by "Black" aircraft, but the umpires judged Wyoming's anti-aircraft fire and the escort fighters provided by Langley to have effectively defended the fleet.

==== 1925–1930 ====
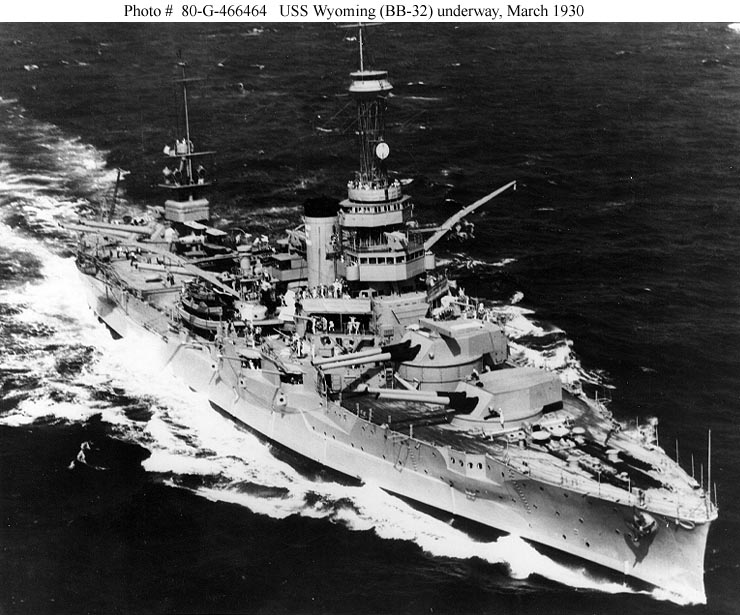
Wyoming underway in March 1930

On 14 February 1925, Wyoming again passed through the Panama Canal to return to the Pacific. There, she joined fleet exercises off California. She then proceeded to Hawaii, where she remained from late April to early June. She visited San Diego on 18–22 June, and then returned to the east coast via the Panama Canal, arriving in New York on 17 July. A cruise to Cuba and Haiti followed, after which Wyoming returned to the New York Navy Yard for an overhaul that lasted from 23 November to 26 January 1926. During this period, then-Commander William F. Halsey, Jr. came aboard as the ship's executive officer; he served on Wyoming until 4 January 1927.

Wyoming then returned to the routine of winter maneuvers in the Caribbean and training cruises in the summer. In late August, the ship went to Philadelphia for an extensive modernization. Her old coal-fired boilers were replaced with new oil-fired models and anti-torpedo bulges were added to improve her resistance to underwater damage. The work was completed by 2 November, after which Wyoming conducted a shakedown cruise to Cuba and the Virgin Islands. She was back in Philadelphia on 7 December, and two days later, she returned to her post as the flagship of the Scouting Fleet, flying the flag of Vice Admiral Ashley Robertson.

Wyoming spent the next three years in the Scouting Fleet. She conducted training cruises with Naval Reserve Officer Training Corps (NROTC) cadets from various universities, including Yale, Harvard, Georgia Tech, and Northwestern. These cruises went throughout the Atlantic, including to the Gulf of Mexico, to the Azores, and to Nova Scotia. While on one of these cruises in November 1928, Wyoming picked up eight survivors from the wrecked steamship SS Vestris; she took them to Norfolk on 16 November. On 19 September 1930, Wyoming was transferred from the Scouting Force to BatDiv 2, where she became the flagship of Rear Admiral Wat Tyler Cluverius Jr. She served here until 4 November, when she was withdrawn from front-line service and became the flagship of the Training Squadron, flying the flag of Rear Admiral Harley H. Christy. Thereafter, she conducted a training cruise to the Gulf of Mexico.

==== 1931–1941 ====
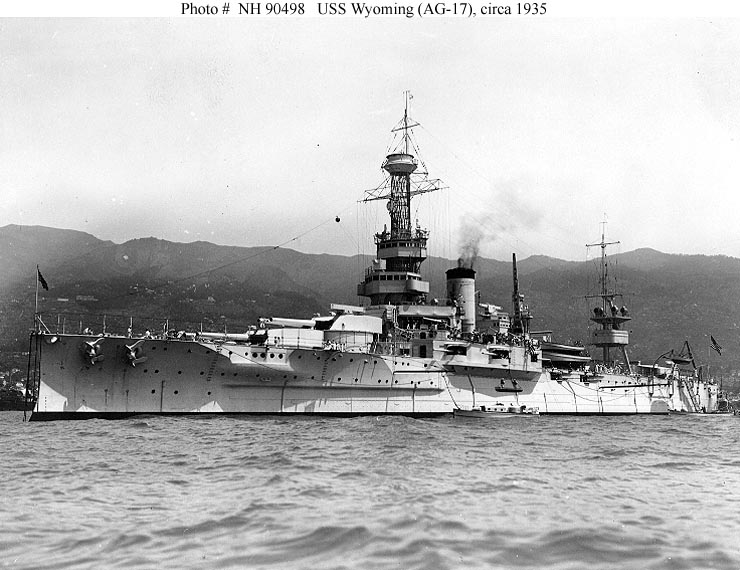
Wyoming in 1935, after her conversion into a training ship

After returning to Philadelphia on 1 January 1931, Wyoming was placed on reduced commission. Under the terms of the London Naval Treaty signed the previous year, Wyoming was to be demilitarized. During the demilitarization process, her anti-torpedo bulges, side armor, and half of her main battery guns were removed. She was back in service by May, and on the 29th, she took on a crew of midshipmen from Annapolis for a training cruise to Europe, which began on 5 June. While en route on 15 June, Wyoming rescued the disabled submarine O-12 and took it under tow to Queenstown, Ireland. While in Europe, she stopped in Copenhagen, Denmark, Greenock, Scotland, Cadiz, Spain, and Gibraltar. The ship was back in Hampton Roads on 13 August; while on the cruise, Wyoming was reclassified as "AG-17", to reflect her new role as a training ship.

Wyoming spent the next four years conducting training cruises for midshipmen and NROTC cadets to various destinations, including European ports, the Caribbean, and the Gulf of Mexico. On 18 January 1935, she carried the 2nd Battalion, 4th Marine Regiment, from Norfolk to Puerto Rico for amphibious assault exercises. On 5 January 1937, the ship left Norfolk and steamed to the Pacific via the Panama Canal. She took part in more amphibious assault exercises and gunnery drills at San Clemente Island. On 18 February, during the exercises, a 5-inch shrapnel shell exploded as it was being loaded into one of her guns. The blast killed six Marines and wounded another eleven. Wyoming immediately steamed to San Pedro and transferred the wounded Marines to the hospital ship Relief.

On 3 March, Wyoming left Los Angeles, bound for the Atlantic. She reached Norfolk on 23 March, where she served as the temporary flagship for Rear Admiral Wilson Brown, the commander of the Training Squadron, from 15 April to 3 June. On 4 June, she left port to conduct a goodwill cruise to Kiel, Germany, arriving on 21 June. There, she visited Admiral Graf Spee. She left Germany on 29 June, stopping in Torbay, Britain, and Funchal, Madeira, and arrived in Norfolk on 3 August. Wyoming resumed her training ship duties for Naval and Merchant Marine Reserve units. She returned to Norfolk Navy Yard for an overhaul that lasted from 16 October to 14 January 1938.

Wyoming performed her typical routine of training cruises in the Atlantic through 1941. The cruises included another European trip in 1938; she took the midshipmen to Le Havre, France, Copenhagen, and Portsmouth. After the outbreak of World War II in Europe in September 1939, Wyoming was assigned to a naval reserve force in the Atlantic, alongside the battleships New York, Arkansas, and Texas and the aircraft carrier Ranger. Wyoming became the flagship of Rear Admiral Randall Jacobs, the commander of the Training, Patrol Force on 2 January 1941. In November, Wyoming became a gunnery training ship. Her first cruise in this new role began on 25 November; she was cruising off Platt's Bank in the Gulf of Maine when she received word of the Japanese attack on Pearl Harbor on 7 December.

=== World War II ===
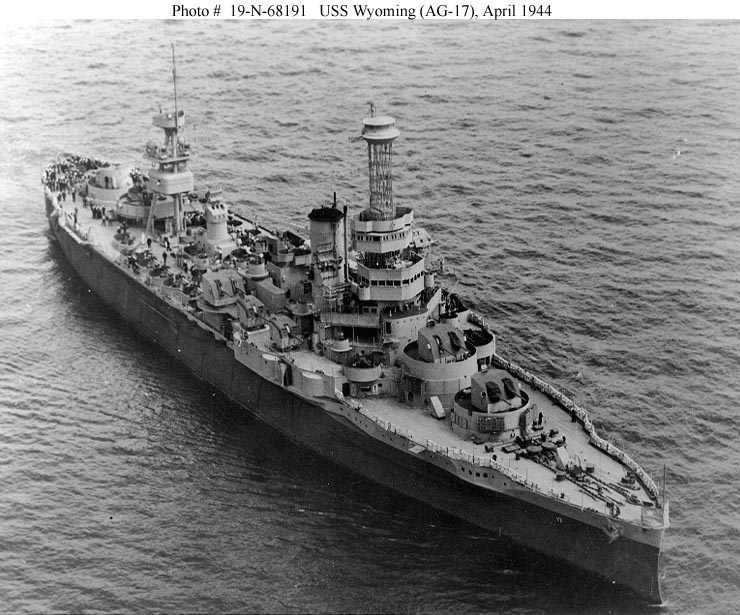
Wyoming in April 1944 after refit that removed her last 12-inch guns.

Following the United States' entrance into World War II, Wyoming performed her normal duties as a gunnery training ship with the Operational Training Command, United States Atlantic Fleet starting in February 1942. She operated primarily in the Chesapeake Bay area, and frequent sightings of the ship steaming around the bay earned her the nickname "Chesapeake Raider". Wyoming was very busy, training thousands of anti-aircraft gunners on weapons ranging from light .50 caliber (12.7 mm) guns to medium-caliber 5-inch guns for the rapidly expanding American fleet. Early in the war, the Navy briefly considered converting Wyoming back to her battleship configuration, but decided against the plan.

These duties continued throughout the rest of the war. Wyoming was modernized at Norfolk Navy Yard from 12 January to 3 April 1944; the reconstruction removed the last three of her 12-inch gun turrets, and replaced them with four twin and two single enclosed mounts for 5-inch/38 caliber guns. New fire control radars were also installed; these modifications allowed Wyoming to train anti-aircraft gunners with the most modern equipment they would use while in combat with the fleet. She was back in service in the Chesapeake Bay by 10 April. Over the course of the war, Wyoming trained an estimated 35,000 gunners on seven different types of guns: 5-inch, 3-inch, 1.1-inch, 40-millimeter, 20-millimeter, .50 caliber, and .30 caliber (7.62 mm) weapons. Due to her extensive use as a gunnery training ship, she claimed the distinction of firing more ammunition than any other ship in the fleet during the war.

Wyoming finished her gunnery training duties in the Chesapeake area on 30 June 1945, when she left Norfolk for the New York Navy Yard, for further modifications. Work was completed by 13 July, after which she left for Casco Bay. There, she joined Composite Task Force 69 (CTF 69), under command of Vice Admiral Willis A. Lee. Wyoming was tasked with developing tactics to more effectively engage the Japanese kamikaze suicide aircraft. The gunners conducted experimental gunnery drills with towed sleeves, drone aircraft, and radio-controlled targets. On 31 August, CTF 69 was renamed Operational Development Force, United States Fleet.

Wyoming continued in this unit through the end of the war, and began to be used to test new fire control equipment. In the summer of 1946, then-Ensign Jimmy Carter, the future President of the United States, came aboard as part of the final crew of the old battleship. On 11 July 1947, Wyoming put into Norfolk and was decommissioned there on 1 August. Her crew was transferred to the ex-battleship Mississippi (AG-128), which was also serving in the gunnery training unit. Wyoming was stricken from the Naval Vessel Registry on 16 September, and she was sold for scrapping on 30 October. She arrived on 5 December in New York, where she was dismantled by Lipsett, Incorporated.
