= 6th Battle Squadron =

Former battleship formation of the Royal Navy

- Active: 1913–1917
- Country: United Kingdom, United States
- Branch: Royal Navy, United States Navy
- Type: Squadron

The 6th Battle Squadron was a squadron of British Royal Navy and later United States Navy battleships serving in the Grand Fleet that existed from 1913 to 1917.

== History ==
=== First World War ===
==== August 1914 ====
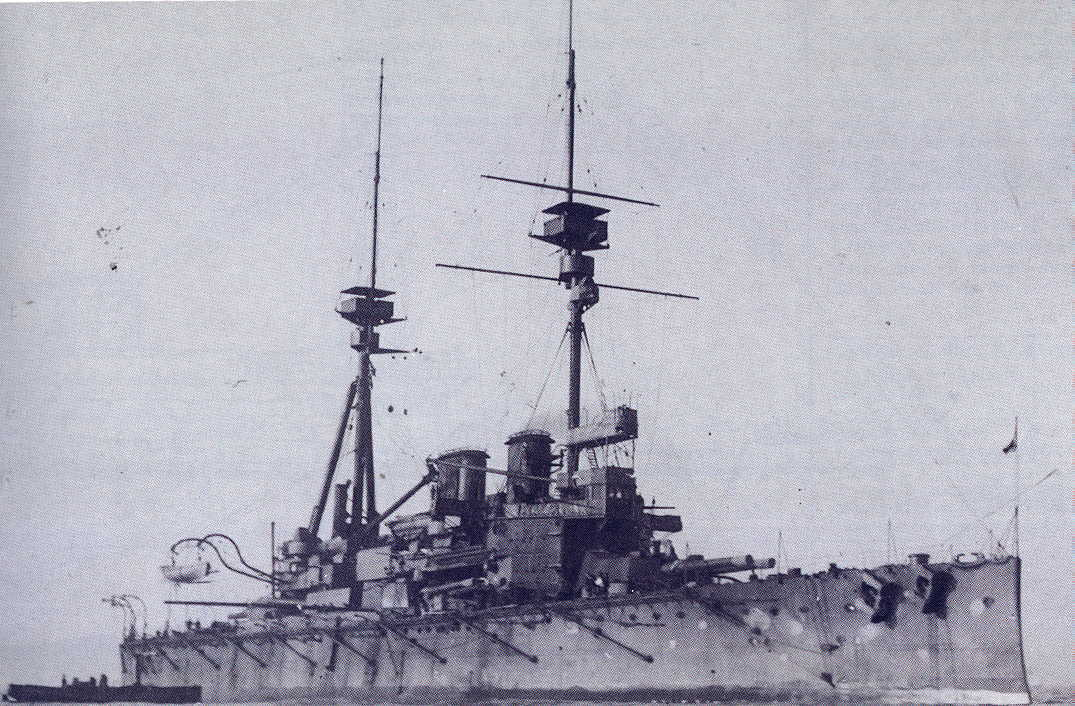
HMS Lord Nelson

In August 1914, the 6th Battle Squadron was based at Portland and comprised a number of the older pre-dreadnought battleships it was then assigned to the Second Fleet these included:

- HMS Lord Nelson
- HMS Agamemnon
- HMS Russell
- HMS Albemarle
- HMS Cornwallis
- HMS Duncan
- HMS Exmouth
- HMS Vengeance

HMS Lord Nelson and Agamemnon transferred to the 5th Battle Squadron in late 1914. HMS Revenge briefly joined the squadron in 1915, before the squadron was broken up. Most of the ships were sent to the Mediterranean.

==== Reformation ====
On 13 November 1917, Rear Admiral Hugh Rodman broke his flag in USS New York as Commander, Battleship Division 9. After preparations for "distant service", USS Wyoming, New York, Delaware, and Florida sailed for the British Isles on 25 November and reached Scapa Flow, Orkney Islands, on 7 December 1917. Although retaining their American designation as Battleship Division 9, those four dreadnoughts became the Sixth Battle Squadron of the British Grand Fleet upon arrival in British waters. The 6th Battle Squadron operated from Scapa Flow and Rosyth.

The U.S. Battleships serving in the 6th Battle Squadron were:

- USS Florida
- USS Wyoming
- USS New York
- USS Delaware
- USS Texas - arrived January 1918
- USS Arkansas - replaced USS Delaware July 1918

== Vice and Rear-Admirals commanding ==
Post holders as follows:

	Rank	Flag	Name	Term	Notes
Vice/Rear-Admiral, Commanding, 6th Battle Squadron
1	Vice-Admiral	Vice-Admiral - Royal Navy	Sir Alexander Bethell	15 July 1913	as 6BS 2FL
2	Rear-Admiral	Rear-Admiral - Royal Navy	Charles H. Dundas	1913 - 20 December 1914	as 6BS 2FL
3	Rear-Admiral	Rear-Admiral - Royal Navy	Stuart Nicholson	5 December 1913 - 12 April 1916	as RADMHFSNORE
4	Rear Admiral	a United States Navy rear admiral	Hugh Rodman	13 November, - December, 1917	BS DIV9 USN

Note: RADMHFSNORE Rear-Admiral, Home Fleets at the Nore.

== Sources ==
- Dittmar, F.J & Colledge J.J., British Warships 1914-1919 Ian Allan, London. 1972; ISBN 0-7110-0380-7
- McMahon, William E., Dreadnought Battleships and Battle Cruisers University Press of America, 1978; ISBN 0-8191-0465-5
