= United States Battleship Division Nine (World War I) =

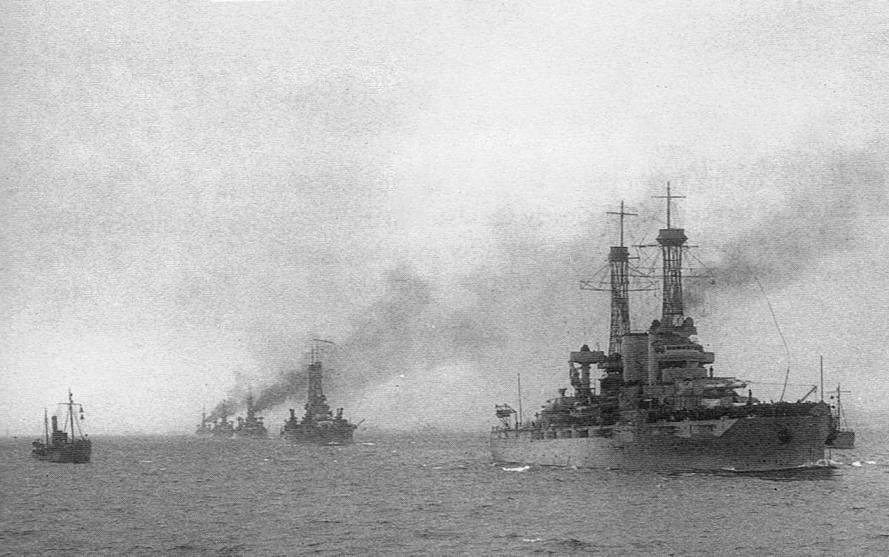
- Battleship Division Nine steaming into Rosyth, Scotland
- Active: 1917–18
- Country: United States
- Branch: United States Navy
- Type: Naval Squadron
- Size: Four, later five, ships
- Engagements: World War I

Commanders
- Commander: Rear Admiral Hugh Rodman

United States Battleship Division Nine was a division of four, later five, dreadnought battleships of the United States Navy's Atlantic Fleet that constituted the American contribution to the British Grand Fleet during World War I. Although the U.S. entered the war on 6 April 1917, hesitation among senior officers of the U.S. Navy as to the wisdom of dividing the American battle fleet prevented the immediate dispatch of any capital ships for service in the war zone. Following a direct request from the British Admiralty and a series of high level staff meetings, American opinion changed, and Battleship Division Nine joined the Grand Fleet on 7 December 1917. Within that organization, the Division served as the Sixth Battle Squadron.

While serving with the Grand Fleet, Battleship Division Nine was forced to adapt quickly to unfamiliar British methods and standards. New signals and maneuvers were adopted relatively smoothly, while more stringent gunnery standards proved more difficult to achieve. On a personal level, relations between American and British officers and men were notably cordial.

Throughout 1918, the Division participated in all major Grand Fleet exercises and deployments, as well as conducting several detached convoy missions in the North Sea. Following the signing of the Armistice on 11 November 1918, Battleship Division Nine was present for the surrender of the German High Seas Fleet on 21 November 1918. On 1 December 1918, the Division departed from the Grand Fleet to return to the U.S.

Although Battleship Division Nine's service was limited mainly to convoy duty and the maintenance of the blockade of the German coast, its presence greatly augmented the strength of the Grand Fleet, thus making major combat between the British and German fleets even more unlikely in 1918. By helping to keep the High Seas Fleet effectively blockaded in port, Battleship Division Nine played a role in ensuring Allied control of the oceans.

== Background ==
When the U.S. entered World War I on the side of the Allies on 6 April 1917, the war at sea was hanging in the balance. Having resumed unrestricted submarine warfare in February 1917, Germany had quickly inflicted staggering losses on the British merchant marine to an extent completely unknown to the American government, or indeed to anyone but a select few at the British Admiralty. At the first meeting between representatives of the two navies in April 1917, the British First Sea Lord—Admiral Sir John Jellicoe—had astonished the new American naval envoy—Rear Admiral William S. Sims—by informing him that Allied shipping losses had recently surpassed 600,000 long tons (610,000 t) per month, and that the Admiralty did not see any immediate solution to the problem.

Jellicoe announced that at present loss rates, Britain would be effectively starved into submission by November 1917. After a meeting at Scapa Flow later in July between Sims, Jellicoe, and Admiral David Beatty (commander of the Grand Fleet), the Admiralty requested that the U.S. Navy send four dreadnoughts and six destroyers to join the Grand Fleet. The Admiralty intended that the arrival of the American dreadnoughts would allow it to decommission five ships of the pre-dreadnought King Edward VII class, freeing up four thousand officers and ratings to serve on new light cruisers, destroyers, and submarines then under construction.

Despite the endorsement of Admiral Sims, the Navy Department initially rejected the British request. Like other navies of the late-19th and early-20th centuries, the U.S. Navy rigidly adhered to the doctrine of Alfred Thayer Mahan, whose first tenet was that under no circumstances should a battle fleet be divided. U.S. Chief of Naval Operations Admiral William S. Benson and Admiral Henry T. Mayo—Commander of the U.S. Atlantic Fleet—were particularly worried that if Britain fell, as developments at sea suggested it might, the U.S. Navy would be left to face the German High Seas Fleet completely on its own.

Having already released precious destroyers for convoy duty, they were unwilling to further weaken the ability of the U.S. to defend itself through the scattering of the all-important battle fleet. Furthermore, Admiral Benson was uneasy about the prospect, ever-present in the early 20th century, of a second war breaking out with Japan. For the moment, the U.S. Navy would send destroyers to Europe, but no battleships.

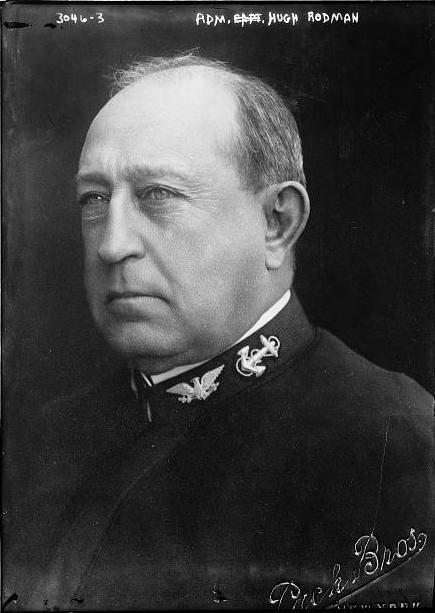
Rear Admiral Hugh Rodman

A series of high level meetings in London, beginning with Admiral Mayo's visit in August 1917 and culminating in a naval mission led by Admiral Benson in November, proved decisive in changing the viewpoint of the Navy Department. Despite Admiral Sims's frequent warnings of the severity of British losses to the U-boat campaign, it was not until both men had seen things with their own eyes that they truly understood the direness of the situation. On 10 November 1917, Admiral Benson cabled Secretary of the Navy Josephus Daniels, recommending the dispatch of four dreadnoughts for service with the Grand Fleet, noting "If, in any encounter, it should be indicated that the outcome would have been more favorable or more decisive had more Allied forces been available, it would be difficult to satisfactorily explain the absence of our ships." On the advice of his trusted aide, Secretary Daniels agreed to dispatch the ships.

The question now came down to which battleships to send. The Admiralty requested that the Americans send coal-burning dreadnoughts, as, due to the submarine blockade, the British were extremely short of the oil needed to fuel the latest classes of American dreadnoughts, the oil-burning Nevada-class and Pennsylvania-class ships. As a result, Secretary Daniels decided to send Battleship Division Nine, made up of the coal-burners New York, Wyoming, Florida, and Delaware.

Though they were not the newest American ships, they were still a major part of their navy; each was capable of a 21 kn (24 mph; 39 km/h) maximum speed and armed with ten or twelve 14 in (360 mm) or 12 in (300 mm) guns. Furthermore, they were commanded by an experienced officer, Rear Admiral Hugh Rodman, a 37-year veteran who had been commended for valor at the Battle of Manila Bay, and was known as an expert seaman. This would serve him in good stead in his new role as joint admiral and diplomat. After nearly five months of hesitation, the departure of the division was finally set for the last week of November.

== Crossing the Atlantic ==
The four ships of Battleship Division Nine—accompanied by the destroyer Manley—got underway from Lynnhaven Roads, Virginia on 25 November 1917, bound for the anchorage of the Grand Fleet at Scapa Flow in the Orkney Islands. What should have been an uneventful transit was complicated by weather that began badly and only got worse as the voyage progressed. After battling a vicious 'norwester' that brought sleet, hail, and snow, the division was further buffeted by a severe gale off the Grand Banks that began on 29 November. Captain Henry Wiley of Wyoming would later recall of that storm, "At the height of the gale, it blew as hard as I have ever seen it, and the seas were the worst I could recollect."

Severe storm damage allowed over 250 long tons (250 t) of seawater to flood the forward compartments of New York, lowering her bow to the point where she was in danger of foundering in the heavy seas. Three days of continuous pumping were required to help keep her afloat. To make matters worse, the high winds—reportedly gusting to 100 mph (160 km/h)— carried away the topmasts on all four battleships, rendering radio communication impossible.

Battleship Division Nine arriving at Scapa Flow, 7 December 1917. Taken from HMS Queen Elizabeth.

The sheer force of the gale drove Delaware, Florida, and Manley off station in the night of 30 November. Though Florida eventually rejoined the flagship when the storm blew itself out, Delaware sailed on alone to the scheduled rendezvous with the British light cruiser Caroline off Cape Wrath, Scotland, where the division would reassemble in the early hours of 7 December. Manley—short of fuel after her fight with the sea—could not rejoin the rest of the force and proceeded directly to her ultimate destination, the naval base at Queenstown, Ireland.

Battered, Battleship Division Nine steamed into the anchorage of the Grand Fleet later that day to the tremendous cheering of the men on the assembled British warships. Wasting no time, Admiral Rodman called upon the commander of the Grand Fleet—Admiral Sir David Beatty—to offer the services of himself, his men, and his ships to the Allied cause. With Beatty's acceptance, the American battleships, while retaining their American designation of Battleship Division Nine, officially became the Sixth Battle Squadron of the Grand Fleet.

== New standards ==
From the beginning, the battleships of Division Nine faced a hard task in adapting to the new methods and practices they encountered in the Grand Fleet. Any difficulties, however, that might have arisen from this transition based on national pride or rivalry were dissipated in large part by the professional example set by Admiral Rodman himself. As he would later note of his squadron's assimilation:

I realized that the British fleet had had three years of actual warfare and knew the game from the ground floor up; that while we might know it theoretically, there would be a great deal to learn practically. There could not be two independent commands in one force if our work was to be harmonious, and the only logical course was to amalgamate our ships and serve under the command of the British commander-in-chief.

This cooperative attitude trickled down through the division, and elicited the admiration and appreciation of the British.

The first task facing the Americans was the adoption of an entirely new set of signals, radio codes, and cipher methods. Although the Americans had studied the general British code while crossing the Atlantic, it was some time before they could use it with anything like the proficiency of other ships in the Grand Fleet. To help in the transition, signalmen and radio operators from the Royal Navy were posted to the American battleships to aid their U.S. Navy counterparts. Though learning an entirely new system of signals was, as Admiral Rodman put it, "almost the same as if in reading we had substituted a new set of letters," within three days of their arrival, the ships of Battleship Division Nine were able to take part in fleet maneuvers in the North Sea with no apparent difficulty.

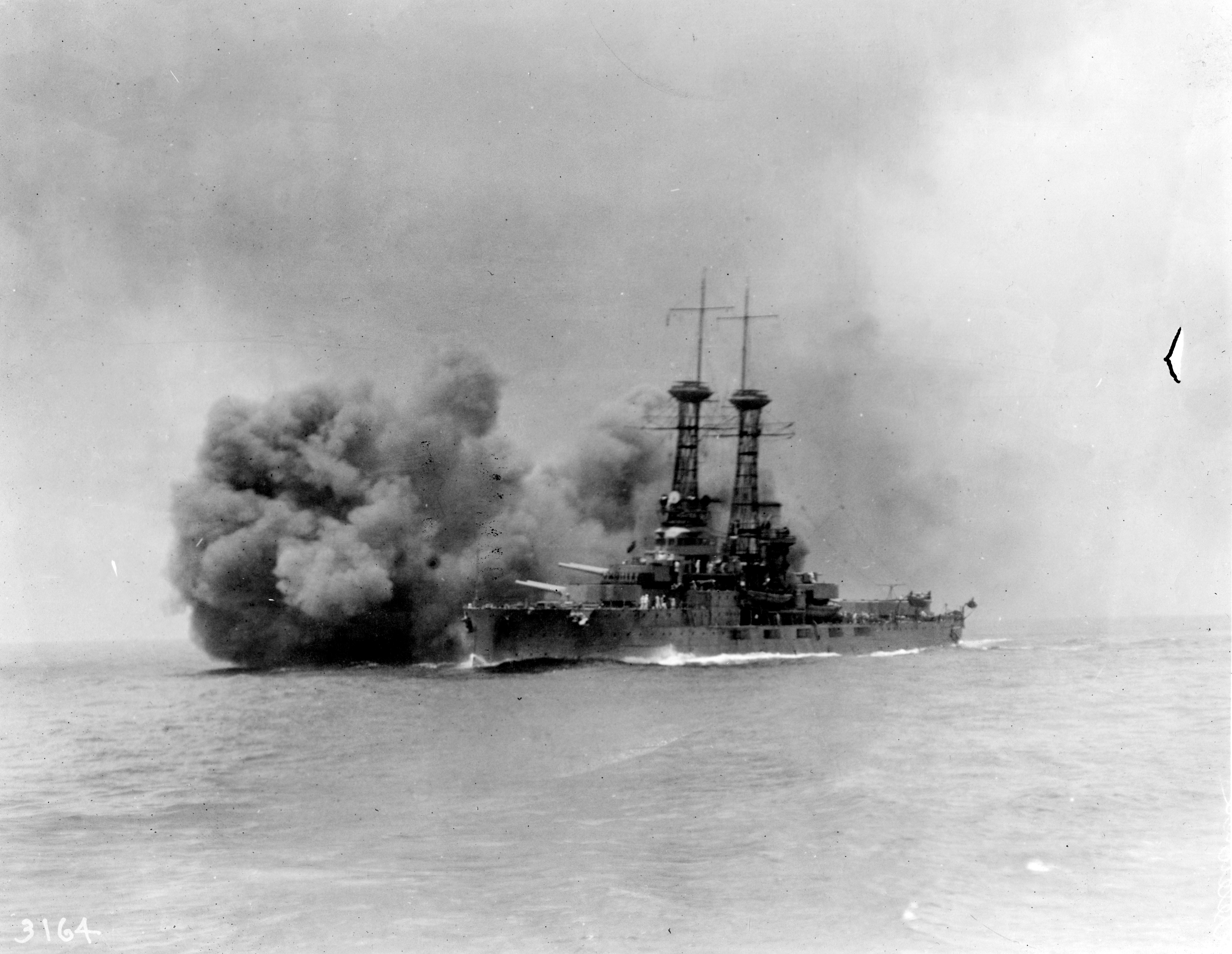
The Delaware at battle practice

Less successful at first were the efforts of the American battleships to match their British counterparts in excellence of gunnery. Having provided numerous veteran gun-crews to serve aboard armed merchantmen in the previous months, the gunnery complements of Division Nine were badly depleted and filled with inexperienced officers and recent recruits. The inevitable effect of this loss of talent became apparent when, on 17 December 1917, Battleship Division Nine conducted its first full-caliber target practice in nearby Pentland Firth.

The results were relatively poor. Where British battleships by the end of 1917 generally managed a rate of fire per salvo of 40 seconds or less, and an average spread (that is, the distance measured between the closest and furthest shots in a salvo) of 300–500 yd (270–460 m), the four ships of the American squadron proved both slow and inaccurate. The rate of fire of Delaware (with an acceptable spread of 475 yd (434 m)) was 108 seconds, and Wyoming' and Florida's average spreads were 956 and 1,131 yd (874 and 1,034 m), respectively.

Only the flagship New York managed to match British practice in both categories. In Admiral Beatty's words, the results were "distinctly poor and disappointing", and led him to the initial conclusion that he could not consider the American division the equivalent of a British one. The Americans worked to catch up, however, and with every target practice registered improved results. By the end of June 1918, Admiral Rodman was able to report that "the firing was exceptionally fine, most encouraging and much better than we have ever done previously".

== Operations ==
Within days of their arrival at Scapa Flow, Battleship Division Nine began participating in the frequent maneuvers and drills that typified the day to day existence of the Grand Fleet. It has been said that because of the good condition and high speed of the American battleships, Admiral Beatty assigned them to be one of the two divisions of "fast battleships" that operated at either ends of the Grand Fleet when it was steaming in battle line formation. As stipulated by the Grand Fleet Battle Orders, the Sixth Battle Squadron was to take station at the rear of the line, where its duty was to engage the rear division of German battleships. However, should the fleet execute a sudden turnaround maneuver, the American ships would become the van squadron, meaning they would lead into battle. The position was an important one, and the Americans were particularly proud of it.

Tasked with this assignment, the Americans got their first true practice in their new role at the end of January 1918, when the entire Grand Fleet went to sea for four days of war games. Under Admiral Beatty's direction, the fleet divided into two opposing forces, with "Blue Fleet" representing the German High Seas Fleet, and the "Red Fleet" including the Sixth Battle Squadron, playing the role of the Royal Navy. At a prearranged point in the middle of the North Sea, the two sides converged for "battle". During one of these exercises, the American sailors were treated to their first encounter with an enemy warship when a German U-boat's conning tower was sighted by the two British battleships directly ahead of New York. Although one of the British battleships attempted to ram it and destroyers rushed to drop depth charges, the U-boat managed to escape.

Though the maneuvers were otherwise unremarkable, they proved a valuable learning tool for the Americans, who got a chance not only to experience British methods, but the violent conditions of the North Sea, as well. As Admiral Rodman noted upon returning from the exercise, "I have seen the largest battleships apparently sucked under until only the superstructures on the upper deck were visible when they would slowly rise from their submergence and the water pour off their decks as it might from some huge turtle... [coming] to the surface."

=== Convoy duty ===
Hard as the Americans worked to incorporate themselves into the Grand Fleet, they had yet to shake a belief among the veteran British that they were amateurs merely playing at war. In writing to his American-born wife following the maneuvers, Admiral Beatty noted that, "The American Squadron enjoyed themselves greatly while we were out, and did well, and will do better next time. I am sending old Rodman out on an operation of his own, which pleases him and gives them an idea that they are really taking part in the war. I trust they will come to no harm."

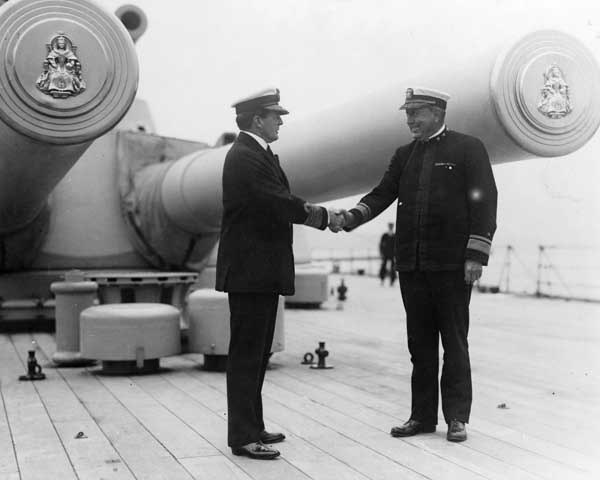
Admirals Beatty and Rodman, 1917

Despite the qualified nature of this comment, the operation Beatty had in mind was both important and potentially dangerous. On 6 February 1918, Battleship Division Nine stood out of Scapa Flow to guard the high value Scandinavian Convoy to and from Norway. Twice in the previous year, this convoy—with its essential cargos of iron ore, nitrates, and other chemicals—had been raided by German cruisers and destroyers, with the loss of 15 allied freighters. To avoid a repeat of these attacks, the British had taken to escorting the convoys with dreadnought squadrons. Still, the possibility existed that the Germans would send out their entire fleet to cut off and annihilate the overmatched battleship squadron, with severe strategic effect.

With this possibility in mind, the American battleships set out, accompanied by the ships of the British Third Light Cruiser Squadron and two flotillas of destroyers, all under the command of Admiral Rodman. This marked the first time in history that British warships had ever served under the command of a sea-going American admiral. Although the outbound trip to Norway was uneventful, things began to heat up for the escort force on 8 February, as they waited just outside Norwegian territorial waters for the return convoy to assemble. Shortly before 14:00, both Florida and Delaware reported sighting numerous torpedoes running in the water, and began maneuvering sharply to avoid being struck.

Delaware also fired a 3 in (76 mm) shell at what appeared to be a conning tower about 2,000 yd (1,800 m) distant, and the escorting destroyers dropped depth charges, with no apparent success. After the convoy returned to Scapa Flow on 10 February, Rodman officially reported to Admiral Beatty that two torpedoes had been fired at Florida, and two at Delaware, and that only the skillful handling of both ships had saved them from harm.

However, post-war examination of German war records revealed that no German submarines had made any attacks that day. It is likely the two ships had instead seen the wakes of porpoises frolicking in the waves. As Captain Wiley of Wyoming noted, such misidentifications were common for inexperienced ships: "new ships arriving in the war zone usually did a good deal of shooting at submarines which were not submarines. With experience, they saw fewer."

Less than a week after their return, Battleship Division Nine was once again called upon to protect the Scandinavian Convoy as part of a general Grand Fleet response to intelligence reports suggesting German battlecruisers were loose in the North Sea. The mission took place in a strong gale that caused damage to ships throughout the Fleet. Delaware suffered damage to her ventilators that caused the generators to stop working, cutting electrical power throughout the ship and forcing a reduction in speed to 12 kn (14 mph; 22 km/h) for nearly an hour. On New York, the strong seas carried a man overboard who could not be rescued, one of the 12 or more men lost throughout the Fleet that day. To make matters worse, the Grand Fleet failed to find the German battlecruisers, and was forced to return to Scapa Flow empty-handed.

In March–April 1918, Battleship Division Nine escorted the Scandinavian Convoy two more times. Both missions were hampered by storms that made the going particularly slow, but were otherwise uneventful. Still, confidence in the wisdom of using battleships as an escort was fading at the Admiralty, and Admiral Beatty in particular was opposed to it. When the American ships returned to the new Grand Fleet base at Rosyth at the end of the second mission on 20 April, it was the last time they were used to escort the Scandinavian Convoy.

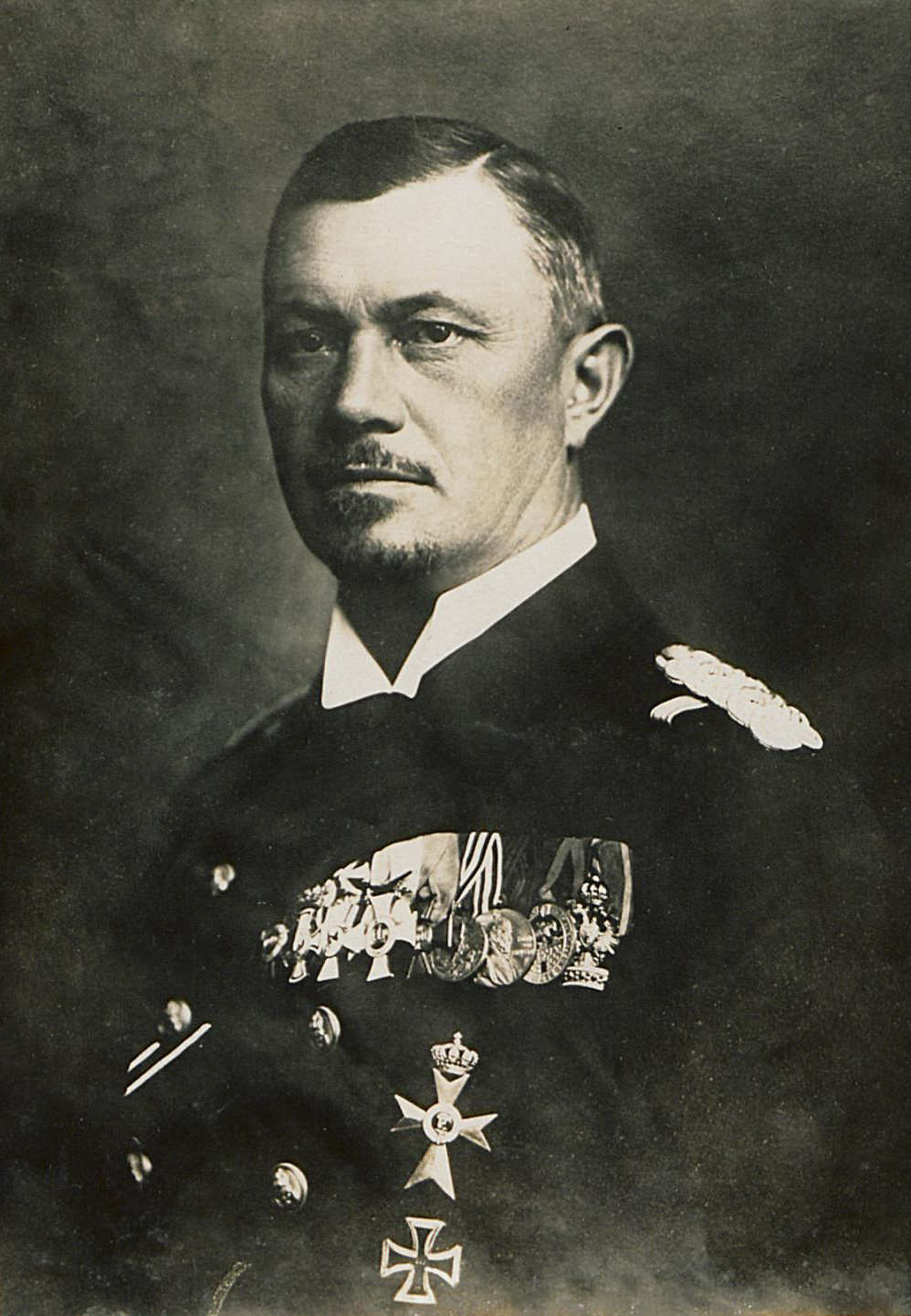
Admiral Reinhard Scheer, Commander of the German High Seas Fleet

Just days later, however, on 24 April 1918, Battleship Division Nine joined the Grand Fleet in one last attempt to bring the High Seas Fleet to battle. German Admiral Reinhard Scheer, aware of the strategic potential of destroying a squadron of British battleships, had finally decided to make an attempt on the Scandinavian Convoy, using the overwhelming force of his entire fleet. Under strict radio silence, the High Seas Fleet sailed on the morning of 23 April to attempt an intercept, leaving the British completely unaware that they had left their base.

It was not until an engine malfunction aboard the German battlecruiser SMS Moltke forced it to break radio silence to ask for assistance that the British became aware of the presence of the Germans in the North Sea. A recent change in the sailing schedule of the Scandinavian Convoy, however, meant there was no exposed squadron of battleships in danger of being overwhelmed that day. Alerted by the enemy wireless transmissions, the entire Grand Fleet sortied to find the High Seas Fleet, offering the prospect of the decisive battle of the war.

However, with Moltke crippled, Admiral Scheer decided to return to base. Though scouting units of the Grand Fleet made brief contact with the Germans on the morning of 25 April, no action followed, and the High Seas Fleet made it home without incident. At one point in the chase, however, a reversal of course by the Germans meant that the entire Grand Fleet was forced to reorient itself in the opposite direction, placing Battleship Division Nine in the van. The result was that, if an encounter between the two fleets had occurred, American battleships would have led the British fleet into what could have been the largest naval battle of the war.

Years later, Admiral Rodman wrote in his memoir that he "often thought what a glorious day it would have been for the ships of our country to have led the Grand Fleet into action." It was not to be, however, nor would another chance present itself: the German fleet did not sail as a unit again in World War I.

=== New arrivals ===
Through the first months of 1918, the composition of Battleship Division Nine changed to reflect the lessons learned from operating in a war zone with the Grand Fleet. It soon became apparent that with only four ships, the division could not maintain the level of preparedness required by the constant need to be ready to sail at limited notice. The inevitable result was machinery breakdowns that reduced the squadron to three ships, a development considered unacceptable given the Division's important position at the tail end of the battle line. The British—faced with the same problem—responded by allocating a spare battleship to each of their squadrons. In this way, each squadron always remained at full strength even when a ship was being repaired.

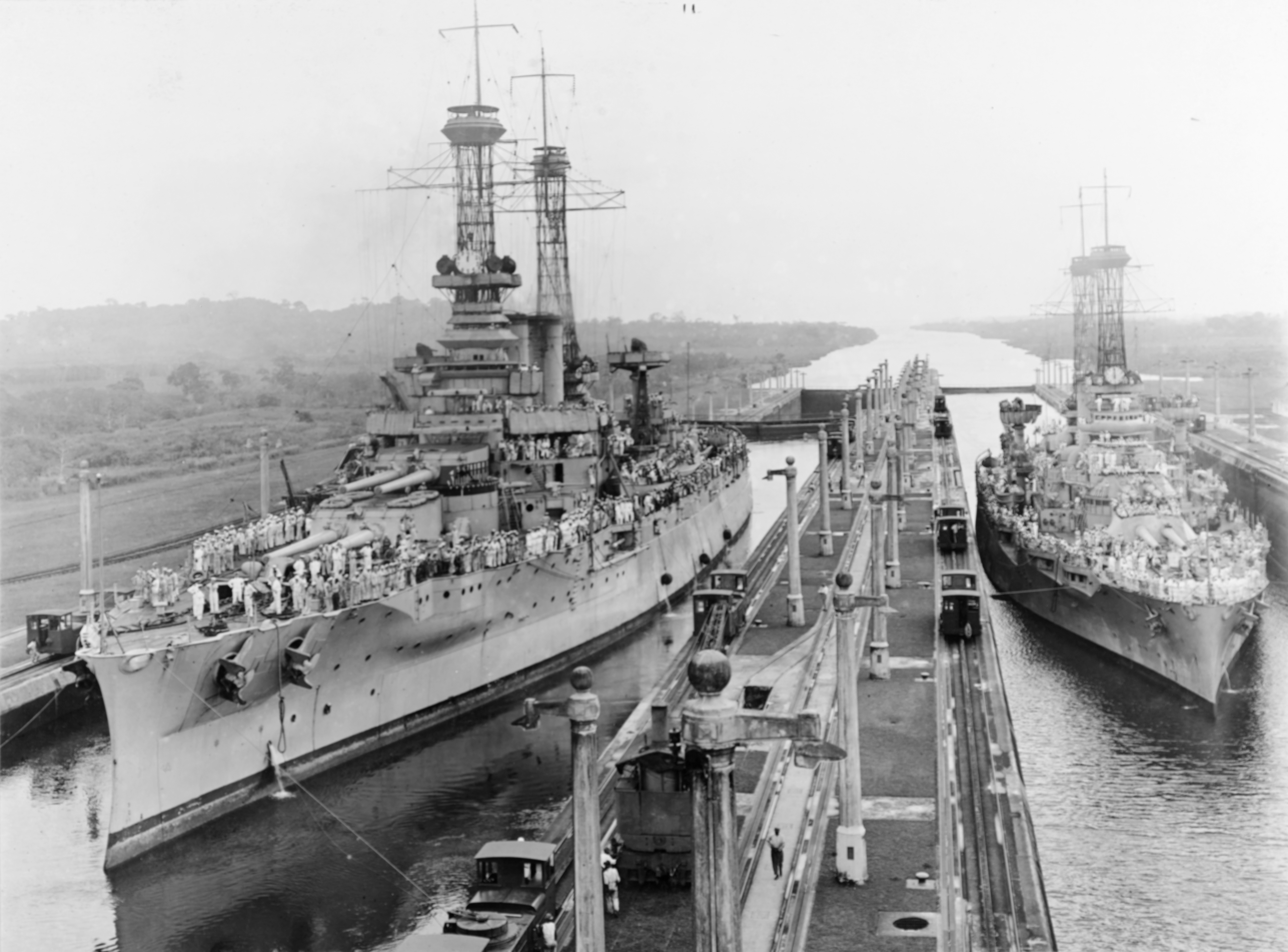
Texas and Arkansas together, 1919

Recognizing the practicality of this solution, Admiral Rodman requested that the Navy Department send another battleship to operate with his division. Specifically, Rodman requested the ship be New York's sister ship Texas, to better match Grand Fleet policy, which encouraged the use of matched pairs to aid in rangefinding. Although there was some grumbling at the Navy Department that a five ship division was counter to U.S. Navy policy, they eventually agreed, and on 11 February 1918, Texas arrived at Scapa Flow.

This arrangement, however, left Wyoming—the third-most powerful ship of the division—as the spare ship because she lacked a matched pair. As a result, Rodman requested that Delaware—the oldest ship in the division—be replaced with Wyoming's sister ship Arkansas, leaving Florida as the spare. Arkansas, however, did not join Battleship Division Nine until 29 July 1918. Delaware sailed from Scapa Flow for the United States the next day.

=== Northern Mine Barrage ===
In late June 1918, Battleship Division Nine began escorting American mine laying craft participating in the setting of the Northern Mine Barrage, a gargantuan project spearheaded by the U.S. Navy designed to close the North Sea passage between Scotland and Norway to U-boat traffic. A novel attempt to end the submarine menace relying heavily on American industrial capacity, the Barrage called for more than 70,000 mines to be placed across a stretch of water 250 nmi (290 mi; 460 km) wide.

Because the minelayers were operating within range of German surface raiders, the American battleships were detailed to provide an escort for them, along with other units of the Grand Fleet. For the most part, these expeditions proved uneventful, but on two occasions, on 30 June and again on 8 August, lookouts on the battleships reported seeing U-boats or torpedoes in the water, forcing the Division to maneuver accordingly. Like the previous sightings made while escorting the Scandinavian Convoy, subsequent review of German war records revealed that both cases were false alarms.

Just days after the second incident, however, Battleship Division Nine was called to more serious action. Having received intelligence that German vessels were loose in the North Sea, the Division sortied from Scapa Flow on 12 October, in company with the British Second Battlecruiser Squadron and the Third Light Cruiser Squadron in the hope of engaging the enemy raiders. From the beginning, the autumn weather was particularly rough, impeding progress and making any chance of sighting the German ships unlikely. (Note: Although the Division was not aware at the time, the report that German raiders were at sea was false. Thus, the weather was not the only reason why they failed to sight any enemy warships. See: Jones, Jerry (1998), U.S. Battleship Operations in World War I. p. 66.)

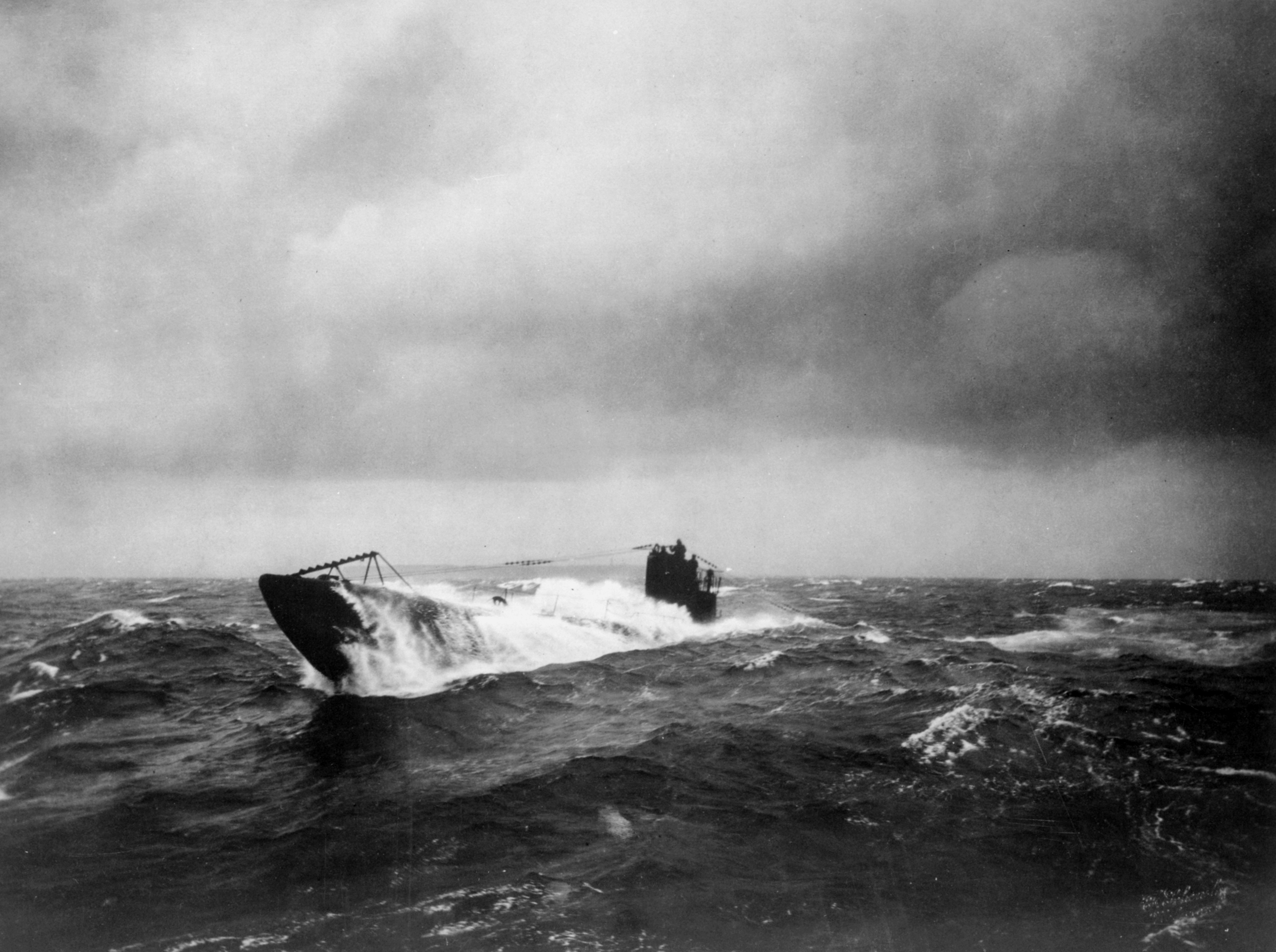
A UB III type submarine, similar to the one believed sunk by New York

On the evening of 14 October, as New York led the force back into Pentland Firth, she was rocked by a violent underwater collision on her starboard side, followed shortly after by another to the stern that broke off two of her propeller blades, reducing the ship to one engine and a speed of 12 kn (14 mph; 22 km/h). It was immediately clear to the men on board that she had struck an underwater object, but the depth of the channel meant it could not have been a shipwreck. Both Admirals Rodman and Beatty concluded that New York must have accidentally collided with a submerged German U-boat. They agreed that the submarine had rammed its bow into the ship's side, then been struck moments later by the ship's propeller. In their opinion, the damage would have been fatal to the German craft.

Postwar examination of German records revealed that the submarine lost may have been UB-113 or UB-123. This strange—and accidental—encounter marked the only time in all of Battleship Division Nine's service with the Grand Fleet that one of its ships sank a German vessel.

New York's ordeal was not over, however. Badly damaged by the loss of a propeller, the ship sailed to Rosyth under heavy escort for repairs on 15 October. At 01:00 the next morning, a U-boat launched three torpedoes at the damaged vessel, all of which passed ahead of her. Unlike in previous cases, sufficient evidence existed to suppose that this torpedo attack was not a false alarm—a number of officers and men aboard New York clearly saw the wakes of the torpedoes in the full moonlight, and a submarine was spotted in the immediate vicinity by a patrol shortly after the attack. (Note: Jones notes in his dissertation that German records do not contain any report of a torpedo attack upon a battleship on 16 October 1918. He states that the attack may have come from one of the U-boats that were sunk in the area around that time, however. See: Jones, Jerry (1995), U.S. Battleship Operations in World War I, 1917–1918. p. 139.)

The battleship's wounded condition is possibly what saved her: although standard procedure was to steam at 16 kn (18 mph; 30 km/h), New York could make only 12 kn (14 mph; 22 km/h) on her one operable propeller. Due to this, historian Jerry Jones believes that the German U-boat captain misjudged the ship's speed. With no further damage, however, the battleship was able to safely arrive at drydock in Rosyth. As the water dropped in the drydock, a large dent commensurate with a submarine bow was found in her hull.

As the war began to draw to a close, the ships of Battleship Division Nine remained busy. With frequent gunnery drill, the ships showed marked improvement in performance compared to the early days with the Fleet. The average spread for the whole division, including the newcomers Texas and Arkansas, was now less than 600 yd (550 m), which was much better than previously, if still not as good as the British average.

Maneuvers and war games continued, as well. During exercises in late September 1918, the Grand Fleet, once again divided into Red and Blue Fleets, "engaged" each other at ranges as extreme as 23,000 yd (21,000 m), a battle-distance unimagined prior to World War I. The rest of the Division's time was spent in escorting minecraft on the Northern Barrage. Though a monumental endeavor, the barrage proved largely ineffective. After an investment of 70,263 mines and more than $40 million (the equivalent of $572 million in 2009), only six submarines were confirmed as sunk by the barrage.

== Life in the Grand Fleet ==
Throughout Battleship Division Nine's time with the Grand Fleet, combating boredom was a constant difficulty. Located at the northeastern tip of Scotland, the islands surrounding Scapa Flow were little more than barren, cold, windswept specks of land devoid of the trappings of civilization. Due to the efforts of the officers to keep their men entertained, however, morale remained high throughout the war. The British worked hard to turn the anchorage into a more inviting place. Central to these efforts were sporting events. The Fleet held numerous inter-ship competitions, including soccer, rugby, rowing, track, and boxing, which were followed with intense interest by the men of the respective ships.

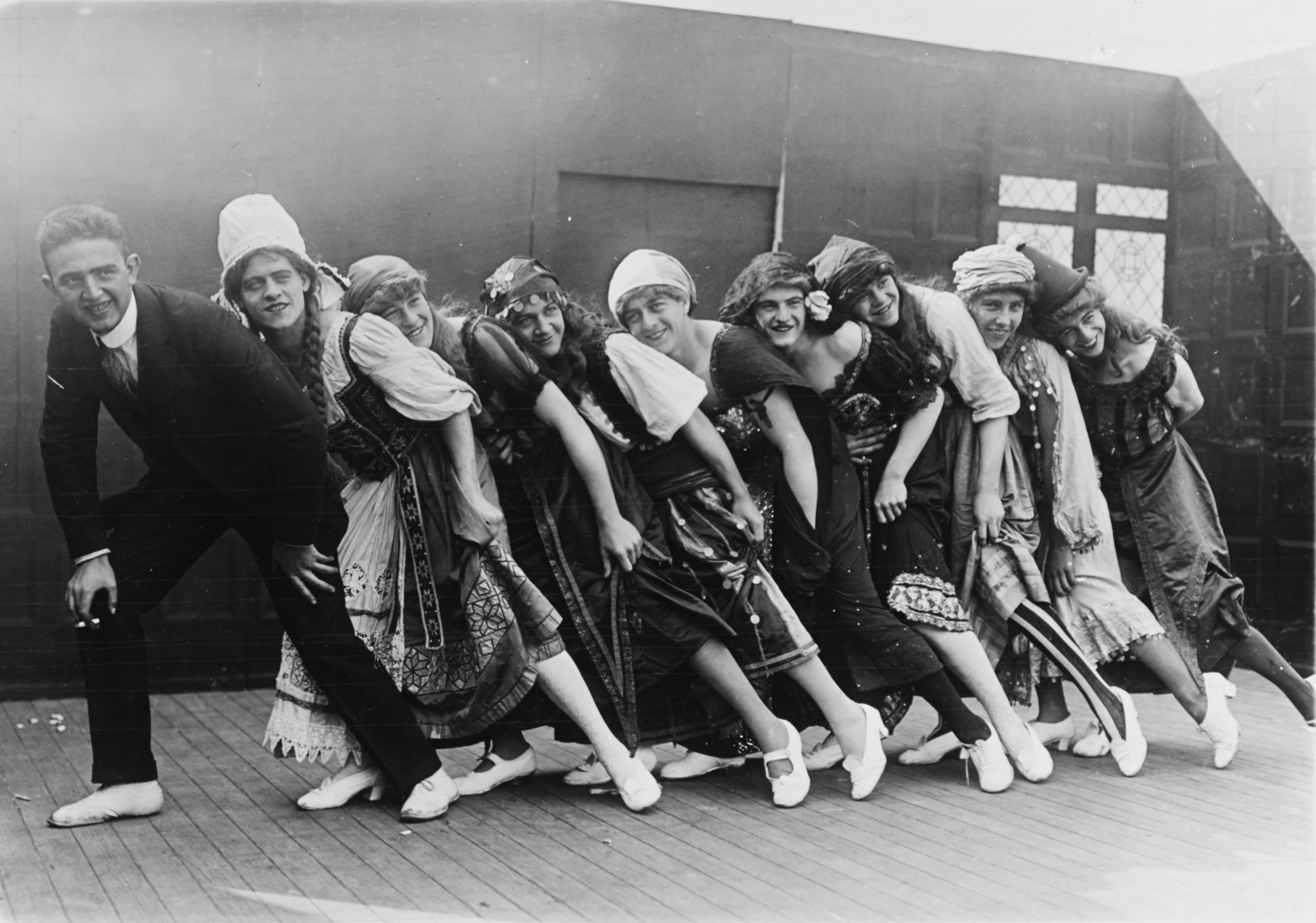
Sailors aboard Delaware participating in the ship's theatrical revue

When the Americans arrived, the British made every effort to include them in the athletics. Space was allotted on the sports fields to provide a football field and a baseball diamond. In short order, the division developed a baseball league that played 17 games during the summer of 1918. Texas won the division championship, but lost to a visiting team from American naval headquarters in London. Football games occurred throughout the fall.

The American sailors participated in Fleet sporting events, as well, giving excellent account of themselves. At the Fleet track meet, Battleship Division Nine finished second, and did even better at the annual boxing championships, the pinnacle of the Grand Fleet sporting year. An engineman from Florida won the lightweight title, a chief carpenter's mate from New York won the middleweight title, and a fireman from the same ship reached the heavyweight finals.

The men found other ways to keep busy besides sports. Throughout the year, every ship in the squadron produced theater productions, and motion pictures were shown whenever possible. Furthermore, leave was granted to the men on a frequent basis whenever the ships were in Rosyth for repairs. On 4 July 1918, Admiral Beatty provided a special treat for the men of Battleship Division Nine by granting them a few days off from all drills and maneuvers in order to celebrate what he termed "this greatest of Liberty Days".

On 22 July, the ships of the Grand Fleet received a visit from King George V. After inspecting the Fleet from the decks of the destroyer HMS Oak, the king presided over an investiture ceremony on board Admiral Beatty's flagship HMS Queen Elizabeth. King George presented numerous decorations, but the first recipient was Admiral Rodman himself. Invested as a Knight Commander of the Order of the Bath, Rodman received the highest honor awarded that day.

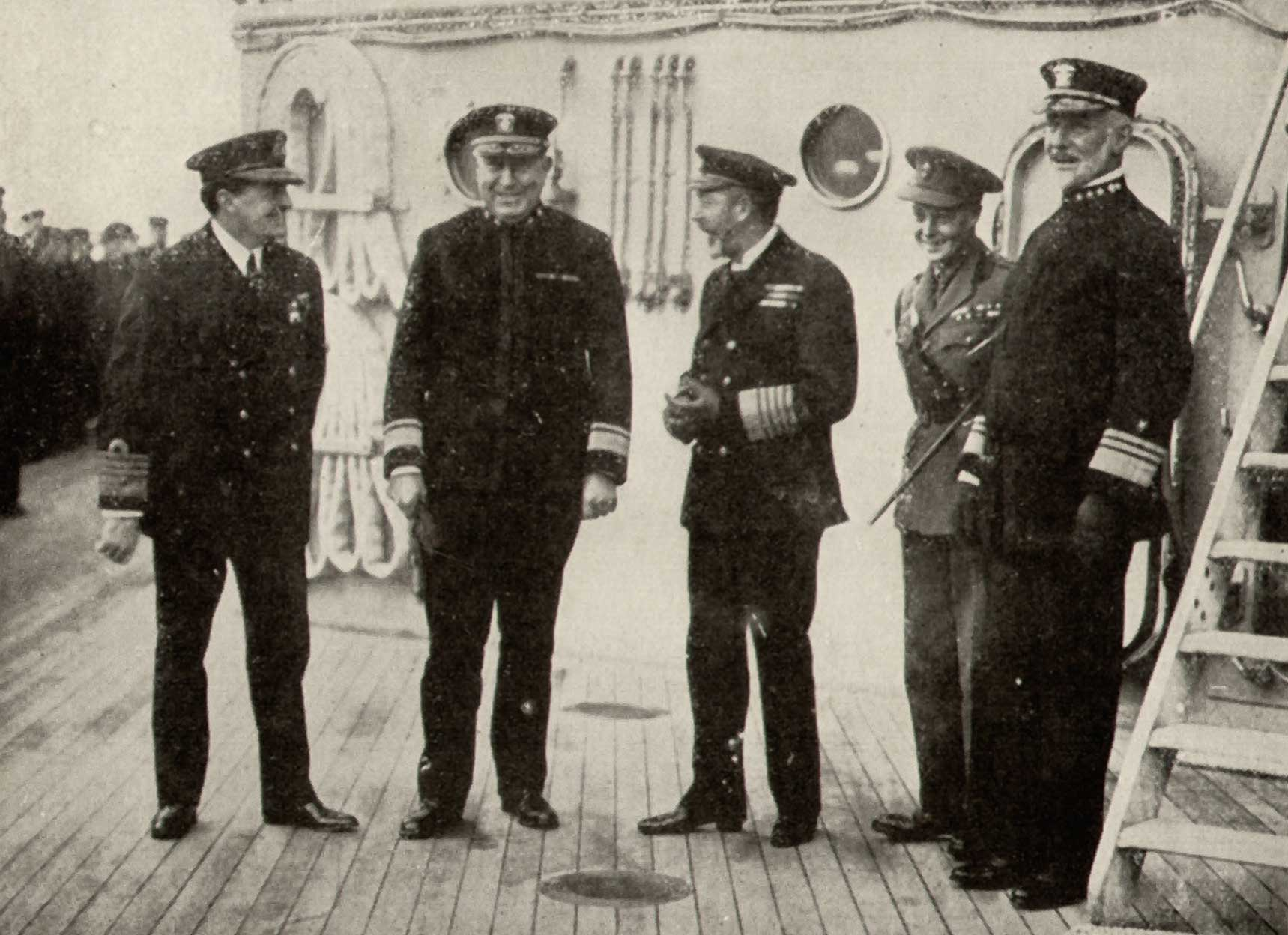
King George V and Prince Edward (later King Edward VIII) with Admirals Beatty, Rodman, and Sims

After lunch aboard Queen Elizabeth, the king visited Admiral Rodman's flagship New York, where he inspected the ship. King George visited her engine and fire-rooms, remarking with admiration to Rodman, "Admiral, your fire-room is as clean as a dining room." After the inspection, the pair retreated to Rodman's cabin for coffee, a smoke, and casual conversation, something Rodman noted the king seemed to particularly enjoy.

Following his departure from the Grand Fleet, the king had a message sent to the officers and men of the ships he had just left. It began with a warm reference to the American squadron: "I am happy to have found myself once more with the Grand Fleet, and this pleasure has been increased by the opportunity I have had of seeing the splendid ships of the United States in line with our own, and of meeting Admiral Rodman together with the officers and men under him. We value their comradeship and are proud of their achievements."

To this, Admiral Beatty replied: "We are glad that Your Majesty should have been able personally to observe our complete accord with the United States Squadron and the firm friendship which binds their officers and men to Your own." These expressions accurately reflected the goodwill that existed between the officers and men of the two organizations. Admiral Rodman, for instance, later wrote that he came away from his service in the Grand Fleet as probably the most anglophile officer in the U.S. Navy, and many a relationship was forged among the junior officers that served both nations well in World War II.

Despite being located in remote Scapa Flow, Battleship Division Nine was unable to avoid a global killer that struck just as World War I was coming to a close. Spanish Influenza—which killed millions worldwide in 1918–1919—did not spare the Grand Fleet. By late fall, an average of seven men per day were dying of the virus throughout the Fleet, and some ships were so badly affected that they were practically unmanageable. Though they were not as badly hit as some of the British vessels, the American battleships were not immune. By early November, only Florida was not in quarantine, and Arkansas had 259 cases, with 11 deaths.

== Armistice ==
Though the situation in the North Sea in late 1918 remained much as it had been for the previous four years—with the Grand Fleet maintaining its endless watch over the High Seas Fleet—the war on the Western Front was rapidly drawing to a close. Operation Michael, the last German offensive, had been stopped in late summer, and with the aid of hundreds of thousands of American doughboys, the Allies had begun to overwhelm the German Army. On 3 October, Prince Max of Baden replaced Georg von Hertling as Chancellor of Germany, and immediately asked President Woodrow Wilson to arrange an armistice.

To the naval leaders of the High Seas Fleet, however, there appeared to be no reason for an armistice. In their eyes, the German Imperial Navy remained unbeaten. Determined not to go down without a fight, Admiral Scheer, by this time head of the German Admiralty, ordered the new commander of the High Seas Fleet, Admiral Franz Hipper, to prepare for a final sortie against the Grand Fleet "even if it should become a death struggle". Accordingly, Hipper developed Plan 19, which called for destroyer strikes against the Thames Estuary and Flanders to draw the Grand Fleet south, where a waiting line of U-boats would attempt to even the odds. At this point, the High Seas Fleet would emerge to engage its opponent in one last titanic encounter.

The admirals, however, were reckoning without their sailors. The enlisted men of the High Seas Fleet, aware that Germany had lost the war, had no interest in dying for the sake of the Navy's honor. When the details of Plan 19 were leaked to the fleet, a mutiny almost instantly broke out, with sailors raising the red flag of revolution and refusing to obey their officers. Faced with a complete breakdown of discipline within his fleet, Admiral Hipper had no choice but to disperse his ships to their homeports in early November. Days later, on 11 November 1918, World War I came to an end.

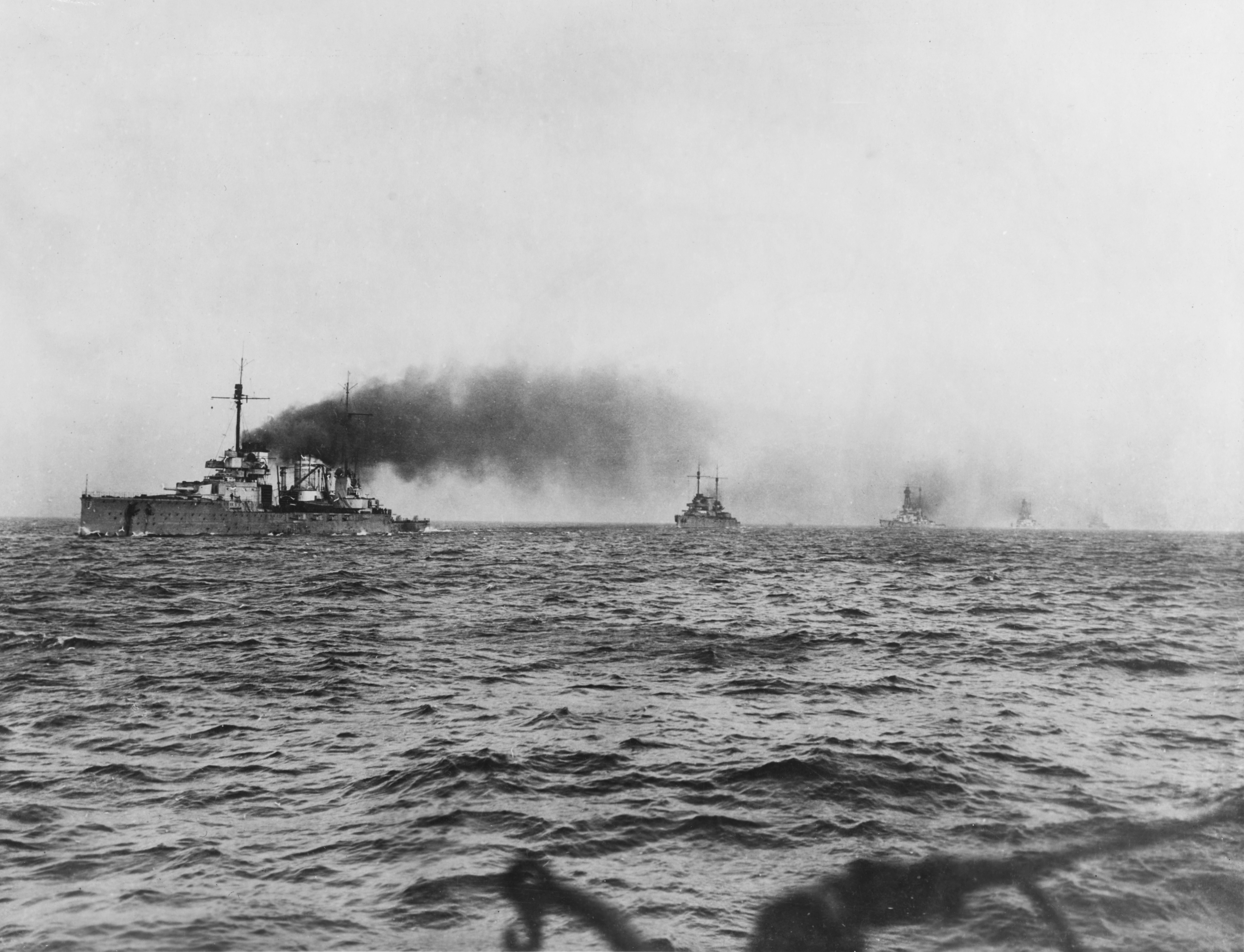
German battlecruisers sailing into the Firth of Forth for internment, 21 November 1918

With the defeat of Germany, the question became what to do with the ships of the High Seas Fleet. Because no neutral nation wanted to host the rebellious sailors of the mutinous armada, the Allies eventually decided to have the force interned at Scapa Flow, with the guns of the Grand Fleet's ships nearby in case of any attempt at a break-out. On 15 November, Beatty met with Hipper's representative, Rear Admiral Hugo Meurer, to arrange the surrender of the German ships. Meurer agreed to surrender to Beatty in the Firth of Forth. From there, the German vessels would proceed to Scapa Flow, until their ultimate fate was decided by the Paris Peace Conference.

=== The surrender of the German fleet ===
On 21 November, the ships of Battleship Division Nine joined the rest of the Grand Fleet to witness Operation ZZ—the surrender of the German fleet. The Grand Fleet—composed of 370 ships and 90,000 men—formed two columns through which the defeated German ships passed. Despite the magnitude of the occasion, it was a bittersweet moment for the men of the Grand Fleet. For four years, the British—later joined by the Americans of Battleship Division Nine—had tried constantly to bring the High Seas Fleet to a decisive battle. To see them coming to surrender, as Admiral Beatty put it, "like sheep being herded by dogs to their folds", left many feeling cheated.

After the ceremony had concluded, Beatty declared, "The Fleet, my Fleet, is brokenhearted." In a similar vein, Admiral Rodman wrote, "It was hard to realize that the ships which we had expected and hoped to engage, would all be given up without a struggle or fleet action, and surrender without a fight." Though such statements reflected the fact that the Grand Fleet had not won the great battle its officers had sought, the peaceful surrender of the High Seas Fleet served as testimony to the strength the Grand Fleet had maintained continuously through four years of war.

=== Significance ===
Service in the Grand Fleet was professionally beneficial to all of us, and at the same time, many of the friendships were made at that time which have persisted throughout the years. With the passing of the years, I have often reflected on the effect service in the Grand Fleet made on all of us young officers. It was a great privilege to serve in that fine organization.

— Vice Admiral John McCrea, United States Navy

With the war over, the ships of Battleship Division Nine departed from the Grand Fleet on 1 December, almost exactly one year after joining it. Though the fact that the American battleships never had the opportunity to confront their German opposites dampened the sense of their achievements, they nonetheless played an important part in the winning of the War at Sea. The presence of the American squadron augmented the strength of the Grand Fleet to the point where any confrontation attempted by the Germans would likely have been futile. Admiral Beatty put it best in his farewell speech to the American sailors, on 1 December:

I had always had certain misgivings [that the German fleet would not come out to fight], and when the Sixth Battle Squadron became part of the Grand Fleet those misgivings were doubly strengthened, and I knew then they would throw up their hands. Apparently, the Sixth Battle Squadron was the straw that broke the camel's back."

Ships of Battleship Division Nine
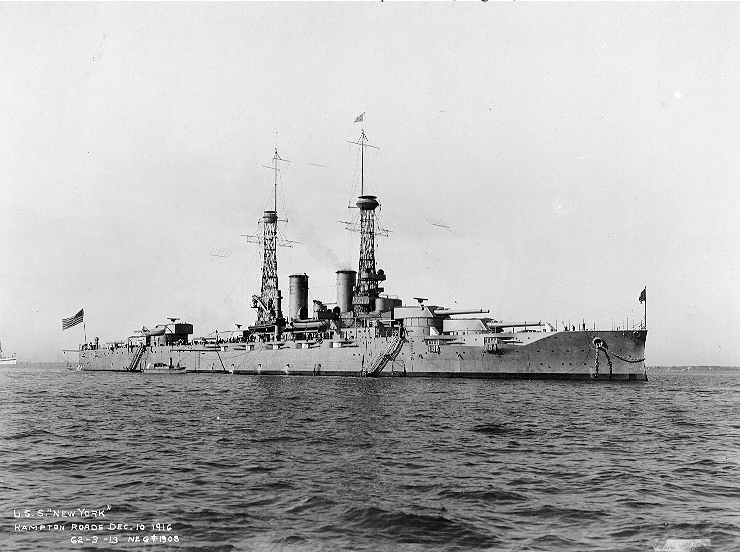
New York

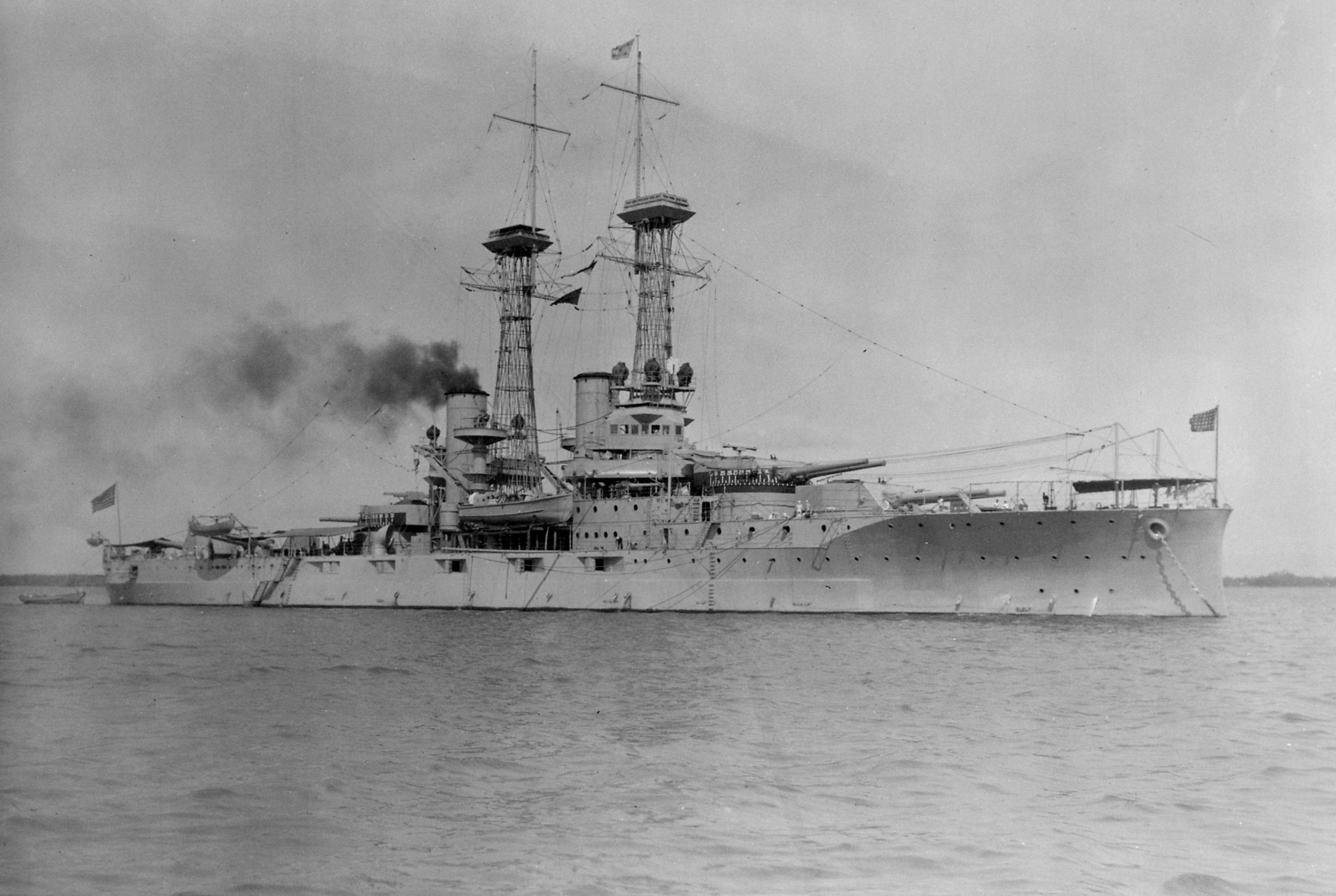
Delaware

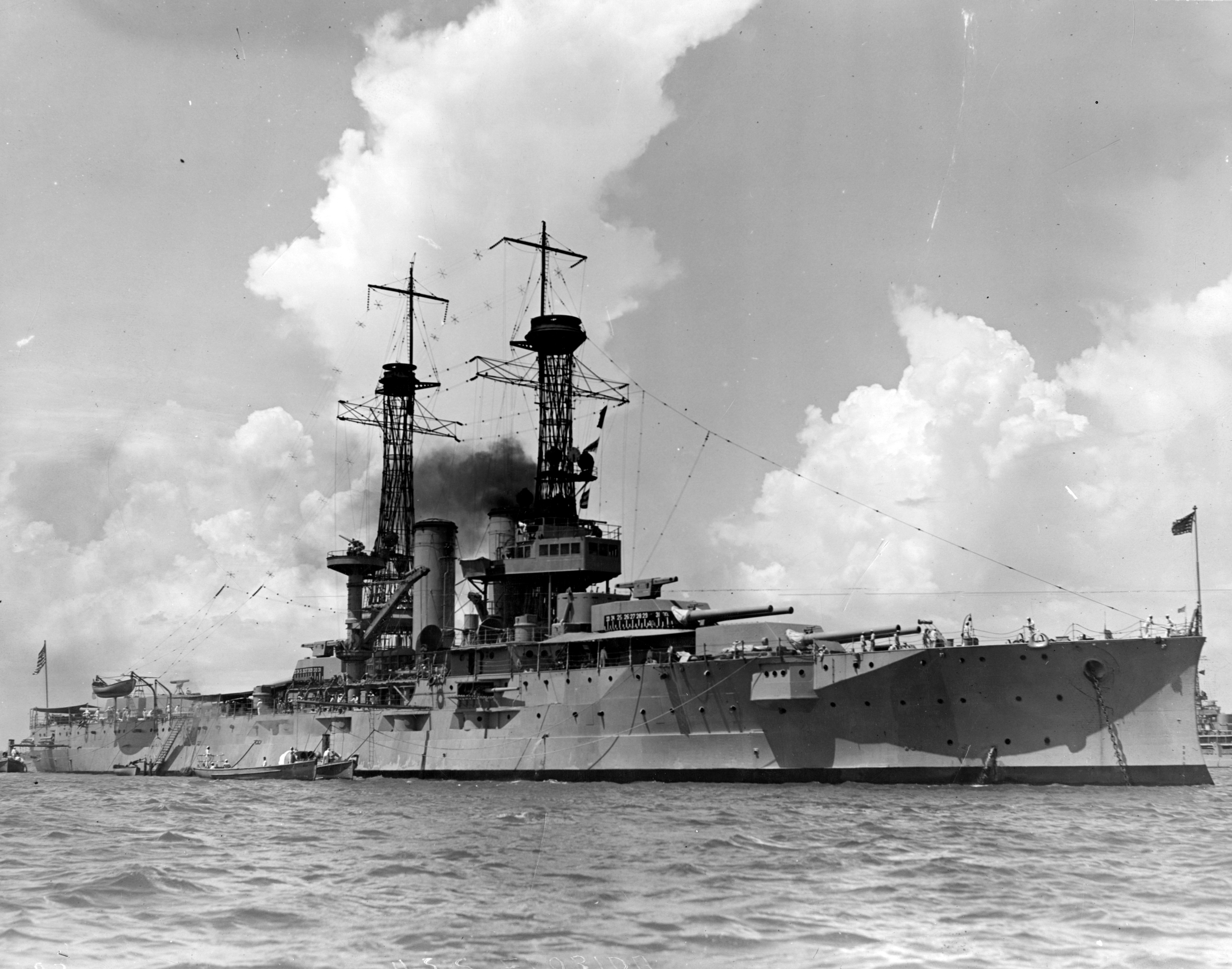
Florida

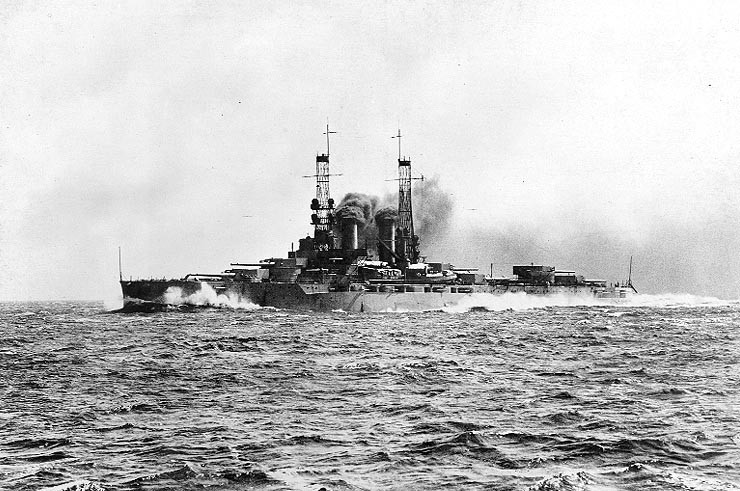
Wyoming

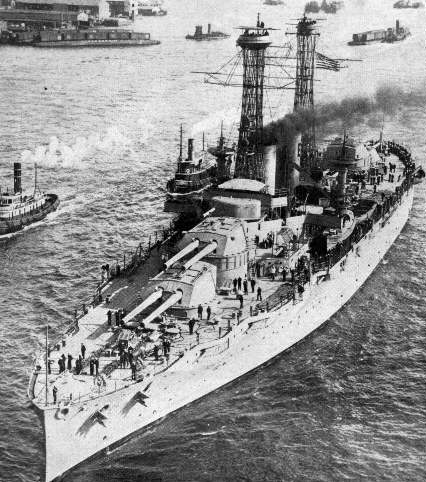
Texas

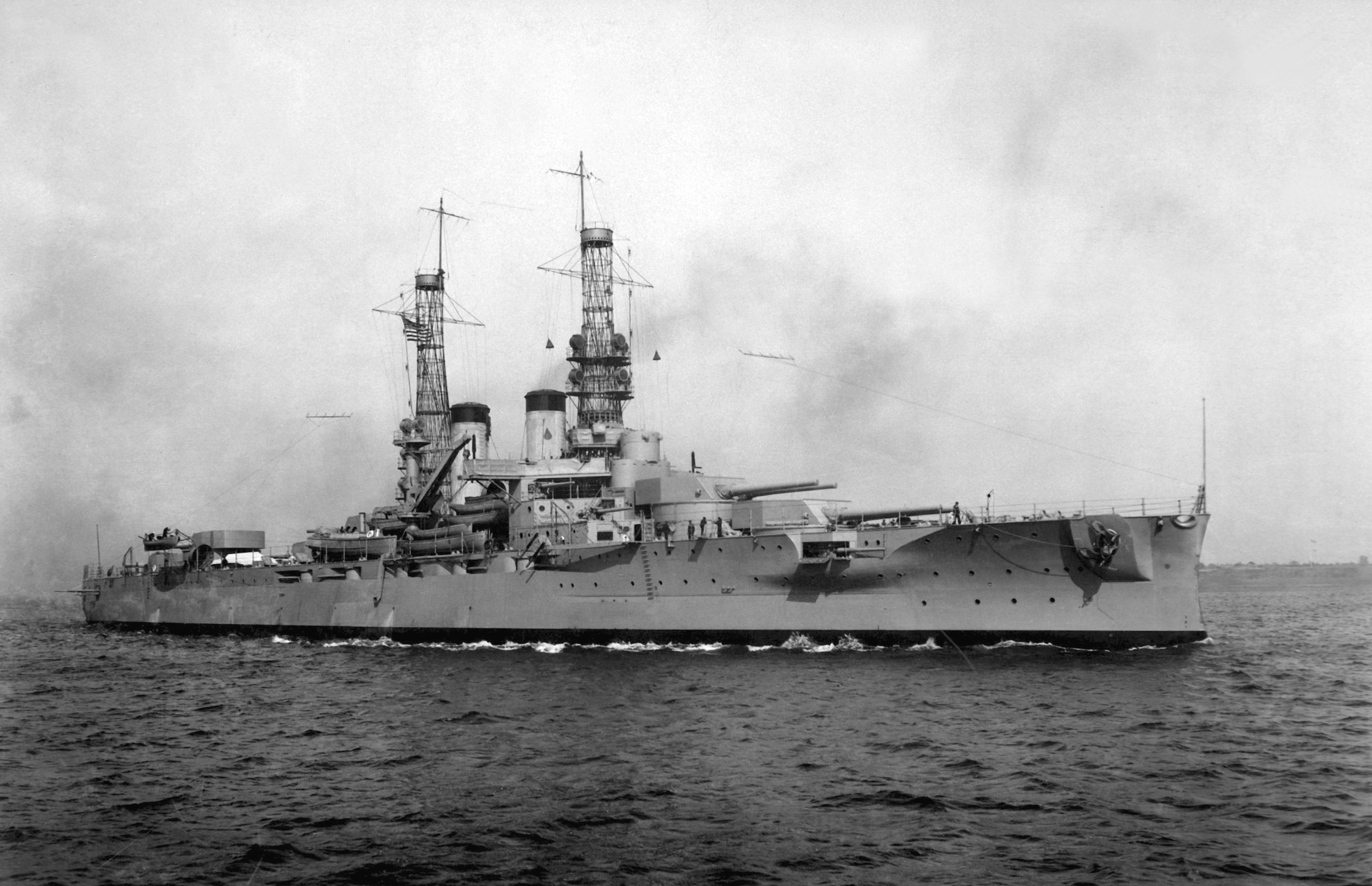
Arkansas

== See also ==
- British Pacific Fleet – An analogous situation in World War II where a British and Commonwealth force operated with the United States Pacific Fleet in 1945.

== Bibliography ==
- Jellicoe, Earl (1920). The Crisis of the Naval War. London: Cassell and Company, Ltd.
- Jellicoe, Earl (1934). The Submarine Peril. London: Cassell and Company, Limited.
- Jones, Jerry W. (1995). "U.S. Battleship Operations in World War I, 1917–1918". University of North Texas, Diss.
- Jones, Jerry W. (1998). U.S. Battleship Operations in World War I. Annapolis, MD: Naval Institute Press. ISBN 1-55750-411-3.
- Marder, Arthur J. (1970). From the Dreadnought to Scapa Flow, Vol. 5. New York: Oxford University Press.
- Massie, Robert Kinloch (2003). Castles of Steel: Britain, Germany, and the Winning of the Great War at Sea. New York: Ballantine Books. ISBN 0-345-40878-0.
- Rodman, Hugh (1928). Yarns of a Kentucky Admiral. Indianapolis, IN: The Bobbs-Merrill Company.
- Simpson, Michael, ed. (1991). Anglo-American Naval Relations 1917–1919. Aldershot, Hants: Scolar Press. ISBN 0-85967-863-6.
- Sims, William Sowden; Hendrick, Burton J. (1920). The Victory at Sea. Garden City: Doubleday, Page & Co.
- Wiley, Henry A. (1934). An Admiral from Texas. Garden City: Doubleday, Doran & Company, Inc.
