= Höcker =

Höcker (also transliterated Hoecker in other languages) is a German surname. Notable people with the surname include:

- Bernhard Hoëcker, German comedian
- Carl Hoecker, Inspector General of the U.S. Securities and Exchange Commission
- Hanskurt Höcker, German Wehrmacht military officer
- Karl-Friedrich Höcker, German SS military officer
- Karl-Heinz Höcker, German theoretical nuclear physicist.
- Wilhelm Höcker, German politician
- Four notable German writers:
  - Oskar Höcker (1840–1894)
  - Gustav Höcker (1832–1911) (Oskar's brother)
  - Paul Oskar Höcker (1865–1944) (Oskar's son)
  - Karla Höcker (1901–1992) (Paul Oskar's daughter)

== See also ==
- Höcker Album, an album of photographs collected by SS officer Karl-Friedrich Höcker at Auschwitz-Birkenau
- Hoecker, Missouri, a community in the United States
- Hocker (disambiguation)
