= Hocker =

Hocker may refer to:

== People ==
- Cole Hocker (born 2001), American middle-distance runner, 2024 Olympic champion
- Gero Clemens Hocker (born 1975), German politician
- Karl-Friedrich Höcker (1911–2000), German Nazi SS concentration camp officer and war criminal
- Willie Kavanaugh Hocker (1862–1944), American schoolteacher and designer of the current Arkansas flag

== Places ==
- Colonia Hocker, a village and municipality in Entre Ríos Province, Argentina

== Other ==
- Hocker (sport), an American team sport

== See also ==
- Höcker
