= Karla Höcker =

German writer and musician

Karla Alexandra Höcker (also used the pseudonym Christiana Rautter; 1 September 1901 – 15 October 1992) was a German writer and musician.

== Biography ==
Karla Höcker was born on 1 September 1901 in Charlottenburg. Her father Paul Oskar Höcker was already a best-selling author when Karla was born. Her grandfather, Oskar Höcker, and her great-uncle, Gustav Höcker, were likewise writers. Karla was initially trained as a musician; she studied at the Berliner Musikhochschule and became a musical director. Soon, however, she began to work as a writer, especially after her father fell ill and she had to assist him. She worked as a journalist and a writer about music, before becoming a professor of music in Berlin. She received an honorary degree in 1977.

In the 1920s and 1930s, she was a member of the Bornimer Kreis, a circle of architects, musicians, writers, and other artists and intellectuals; the nucleus of the Bornimer Kreis consisted of landscape architects Karl Foerster, Hermann Mattern, and Herta Hammerbacher. Members included pianist and composer Wilhelm Kempff, conductor and composer Wilhelm Furtwängler (whom Höcker later went on tour with), and architects Otto Bartning and Hans Poelzig.

She spent World War II in Berlin, and published a war memoir, Beschreibung eines Jahres: Berliner Notizen 1945, in which she noted, with surprise, that the Red Army did not kill or deport the majority of the civilian population, and, like other authors of the period, spoke of how Berlin in 1945 and 1946 was felt to be in an "in-between" time. After the war, she became friends with Dietrich Fischer-Dieskau, one of the greatest Lieder performers of the post-war period, and later collaborated with him in his writings.

She died on 15 October 1992.

== Works ==
Höcker wrote novels and biographies of artists and musicians, and did interviews for German radio. She published some of those interviews in Gespraeche mit Berliner Kuenstlern ("Conversations with Berlin artists").

== Books authored (selection) ==
- Erlebnis in Florenz. Novel. Velhagen & Klasings Feldpost-Lesebogen, without Nr., Bielefeld 1943
- Gespräche mit Berliner Künstlern. Stapp, 1964
- Die letzten und die ersten Tage: Berliner Aufzeichnungen 1945. Hessling, 1966.
- Johannes Brahms: Begegnung mit dem Menschen. Mit 79 zeitgenössischen Bildern, Notenbeispielen und Dokumenten. (Introduction by Dietrich Fischer-Dieskau). Klopp, 1983
- Beschreibung eines Jahres: Berliner Notizen 1945. Arani, Berlin 1984.
- Franz Schubert in seiner Welt. Deutscher Taschenbuchverlag, Munich 1984. ISBN 978-3-423-07946-4
