= Gregorius Sickinger =

- Born: c. 1558; Solothurn
- Died: 1631
- Known for: Woodcut, copper engraving, etching, painting

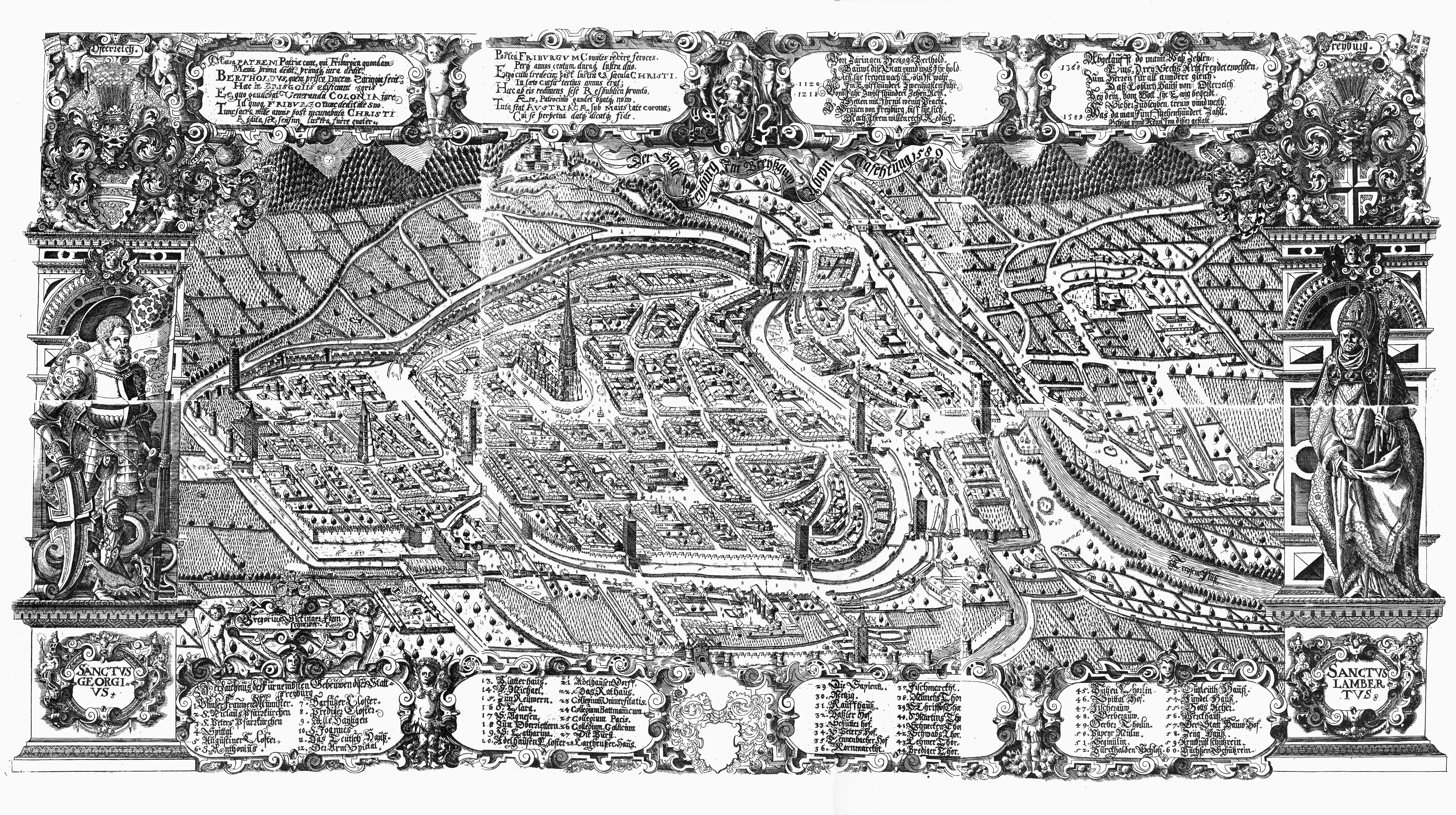
Freiburg im Breisgau, 1589

Gregorius Sickinger (c. 1558–1631) was a Swiss artist active as a woodcutter, copper engraver, etcher and painter. He worked for Basel book printers early in his career and became known especially for large city views, including his 1589 copper-engraved view of Freiburg im Breisgau.

== Biography ==
Gregor Sickinger was born in Solothurn around 1558.

Early in his career, Sickinger produced illustrations for Basel book printers, including the Petri printing house. It is unclear whether this activity formed part of an apprenticeship.

His connection with the exiled Bishop of Basel led to a period in Freiburg im Breisgau. After a longer period in Solothurn, Sickinger was active in Bern in the early 17th century. He probably spent the final decades of his life in Solothurn, where most of his late work was produced.

In 1625, Sickinger was listed among the living members of the Brotherhood of Saint Luke in Solothurn. A Solothurn council record from 1627 places him in the Thüringerhaus, a civic almshouse. Sickinger died in 1631.

== Work ==
Sickinger worked as a woodcutter, copper engraver, etcher and painter. He was known especially for large city views. In 1582, he made a coloured pen-and-ink view of Fribourg, followed in 1589 by engraved views of Freiburg im Breisgau. The copper-engraved view of Freiburg im Breisgau from 1589 became his principal individual work and had a favourable contemporary reception.

His later city views included a plan of Solothurn from 1591 and a view of Bern made between 1603 and 1607. He also produced bookplates, coats of arms, numerous book woodcuts and a series of the thirteen banner bearers of the Swiss Confederacy. Surviving images from the banner-bearer series include those for Fribourg, Solothurn, Schaffhausen and Appenzell.

In Solothurn and the surrounding area, his work included wall paintings and ceiling frescoes. His works are held by institutions including the Kupferstichkabinett of the Öffentliche Kunstsammlung Basel, the Augustinermuseum in Freiburg im Breisgau, the Museum für Kunst und Geschichte in Fribourg, the Zentralbibliothek Solothurn and the Swiss National Museum in Zürich.

== Gallery ==
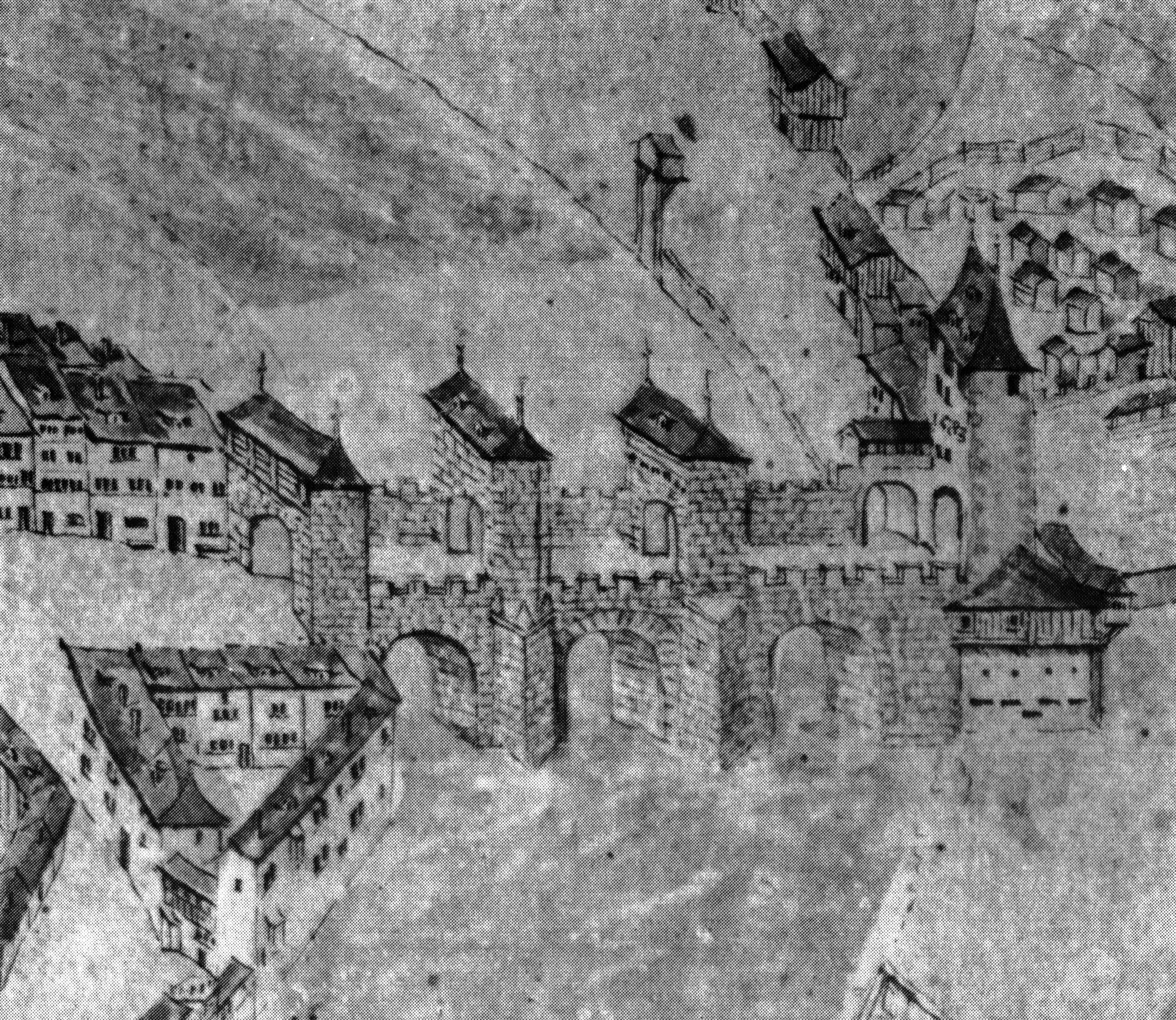
Untertorbrücke in Bern, 1600

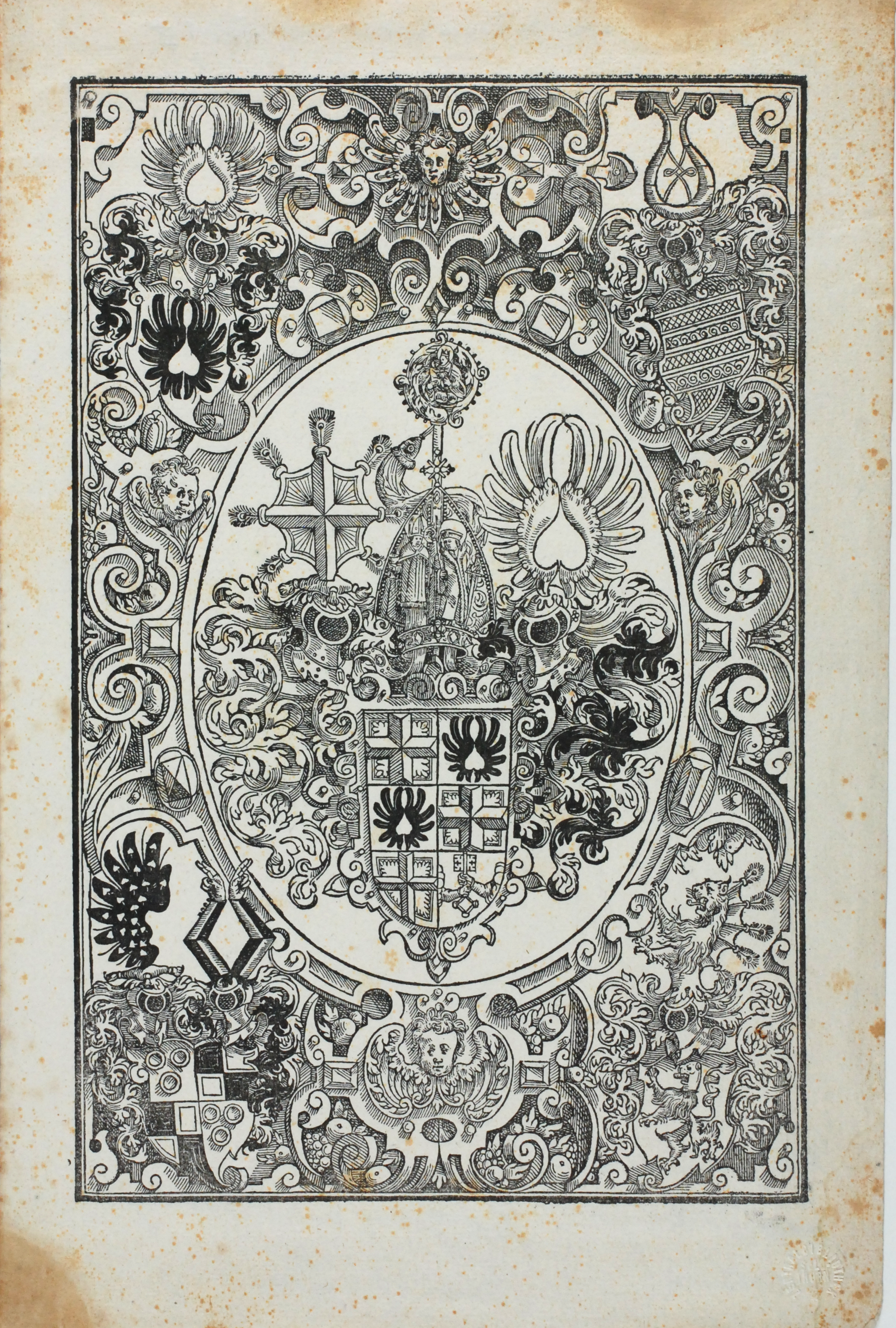
Coat of arms of Georg von Hallwyl, Bishop of Constance
