= Fleet Landing Exercises =

- Badge of the United States Marine Corps
- Active: 1935 to 1941
- Country: United States
- Branch: Department of the Navy: United States Marine Corps; United States Navy
- Role: Amphibious warfare, expeditionary warfare
- Size: 1935: 1,500 Marines; 1936: 1,800 Marines; 1937: 2,700 Marines, 800 Army; 1938: 1,850 Marines, 600 Army; 1939: 2,200 Marines; 1940: 2,250 Marines; 1941:
- Garrison/HQ: Fleet Marine Force, established 7 December 1933

The Fleet Landing Exercises, or FLEX were amphibious landing exercises conducted by the United States Navy and United States Marine Corps between 1935 and 1941. The purpose of these exercises was to formulate a workable amphibious warfare doctrine. The development of the necessary craft and other equipment, and the proper tactical deployment of them were also results. Finally, the exercises demonstrated the usefulness of a standing body of Marines, the Fleet Marine Force, specially prepared for amphibious expeditions.

== Origins ==
The history of amphibious warfare predates Greek antiquity. In United States history, early in the Revolution, Colonial marines were used to conduct amphibious landings and raids such as the Battle of Nassau, and the Penobscot Expedition. Amphibious operations were mounted in the American Civil War, and also prominently in the Spanish–American War. Though this history produced a system of landing procedures, the advent of the motor vehicle (the tank in particular) and the airplane required planners to think more critically about the feasibility of amphibious operations.

In Panama, during the 1920s, the Marine Corps conducted a few modest experiments concerning modern amphibious warfare. At the beginning of the 1930s American defense policy shifted as the threat of the expansionist Japanese Empire became more apparent. The establishment of the Fleet Marine Force and greater concentration on the feasibility of amphibious assault were the direct result. Developing the ability to capture Japanese held islands during a Pacific war against Japan was a vital part of US war contingency plans; War Plan Orange. It was not until these contingency plans described the necessity of amphibious capability that testing key maneuvers in amphibious landings was funded.

== History ==
After the First World War and until the mid-1930s, appropriations for the United States Navy were small. Ships fitted as troop transports were not priorities for the Navy in fact or in theory, so as a stop-gap measure the responsibility fell to battleships and cruisers to lift Marine landing forces. As a consequence of the standard davits on Navy ships, a length of 30’, the spacing of the davits fitted to these ships, and a weight of 5 tons (the maximum capacity of the davits) were imposed as basic requirements for all new landing craft

Soon after the formation of the Fleet Marine Force, plans were made for training the FMF in landing operations in the Caribbean. The northwest peninsula of Culebra Island was chosen as the training area. The experimental problem used for the training involved a landing attack by the Fleet Marine Force embarked on Navy vessels moving from ship to shore in ship's boats and cutters. The Training Squadron consisted of the battleships Arkansas, Wyoming, and a destroyer squadron. In December 1934, a conference between Brigadier General C. H. Lyman of the Fleet Marine Force and Admiral C. S. Freeman was held aboard the flagship Trenton at St. Petersburg. Florida, to develop plans. The Marine contribution to the exercise included the 1st Marine Brigade, stationed at Quantico, composed of two infantry battalions, an artillery battery from the 10th Marine Regiment, and small engineer and service units.

=== FLEX 1 ===
The first of the exercises started 15 January on the beaches of Culebra and Vieques until March 15, 1935. The lift was provided by 18 ships' boats and one dumb barge artillery lighter. Fleet Landing Exercise Number 1 tested a series of theoretical and practical assumptions collected by the United States Marine Corps and Navy that soon became "Tentative Landing Operations Manual" of 1935. The exercises included landings, naval gunfire experiments, and the use of aviation in landing operations. Aircraft conducted aerial reconnaissance and bombardment sorties. The Caribbean fleet tested a range of weapons while the Marines moving from ship-to-shore employed machine guns, 81-mm mortars, and the 75-mm pack howitzers against beach targets. Due to the mixed results experienced with the boats used in the exercise, the Marines concluded that landing boat design needed to be improved. In one of the experiments, a boat was successfully covered in a protective smoke screen, but this caused the landing party to immediately halt, and the waves broke up the unit, while many boats lost their way to the beachhead. While the landing parties were ashore, the Navy held naval gunfire tests to assess the effects of different shells and fuses. These test concluded that area suppressing fire was far better than attempting pin-point bombardment. However, many supporting fire practices, both by aircraft and warships, were strictly limited due to safety precautions for the Marines conducting maneuvers along the beach. The outcome of these exercises convinced the Marines that better landing craft and boats were needed, as well as more dependable communications equipment and techniques.

=== FLEX 2 ===
The Fleet Landing Exercise Number 2 was conducted from January 4 to February 24, 1936, marking the beginning of the Culebra/Vieques Inner Range or the Culebra/Vieques Complex as it would be known until 1975 and the closing of the Culebra subranges. The amphibious exercises were transferred from Culebra's Flamenco Beach to Vieques, and naval gunfire practice began on Flamenco Beach and on the adjacent Flamenco Point. The 1st Brigade had revealed many of the same mistakes seen in FLEX1 but encountered several new problems. The Marines needed to get closer to the beach and the battleships were not able to tread in shallow waters. As for the landing craft boats, the problem was still not resolved as they were slow and extremely vulnerable. In several testing of various boats, they found that they proved to highly unstable for gun platforms, dangerous in disembarking the troops and were incapable in crossing submerged coral reefs. The uses of smoke and darkness to conceal the beach landings were still causing confusion amongst the landing parties. While the artificial naval gunfire tests were being continued, the rapid area fire had made the aerial spotting difficult for the pilots. And still communications were a problems. However, the barrage-type bombardment met the approval for the Army Officer-Observers to reinforce a fundamentally sound doctrine. The Marine brigade gained tactical experience in the amphibious maneuvers ashore but the FLEX 2 had not made any significant breakthroughs in fixing the problems encountered during FLEX1.

=== FLEX 3 ===
The Fleet Landing Exercise Number 3 was conducted on San Clemente, California from January 26 to March 3, 1937, in agreement with U.S. Attack Force Operation Plans 1-37 and 2-37. The 1st Marine Brigade was transferred to San Diego for the exercise and was absorbed by the small-sized 2nd Marine Brigade; the whole Fleet Marine Force. Also present were the understrength provisional Army 1st Expeditionary Brigade. And once again, the testing problems of previous exercises presented themselves. The heavy California surf proved the landing boats were infeasible for beach landings; the Navy coxswains disembarked their troops too far from the beach, broached their boats, or dispersed the concentration of the landing in scouting out better, safer landing spots. After five standard-type naval boats foundered in four-foot surf, efforts to adapt these were ended. They were criticized for lacking speed and maneuverability and being difficult to handle in surf. The experience proved conclusively that a specially designed landing boat with superior power, maneuverability, protection and surf-riding qualities was vital for landing operations. Smoke and darkness continued to present problems as in earlier tests. Bombardment tests were extensive but the spotting techniques, ordnance, and communications used remained unsatisfactory. The only significant improvements for the landing forces were the new Army Radios that were highly effective for communications and the Marine pack howitzer batteries showing that they could deploy on the shore efficiently. Plus, they learned that aerial attacks had to be made at certain right angles to the direction of the attack to avoid friendly fire. The pilots however argued that they lacked the special-type of attack aircraft and the proper air-ground communications before they were to gain precision in strafing and bombing. Two aircraft squadrons, from Quantico, VA. and North Island, composed of the VF, VO, VB, and VJ aircraft. Also, FLEX 3 was the first time cargo nets used for embarking troops to the landing boats. The method proved a success, but as in the past, other Marines were loaded into boats at the rail before lowering.

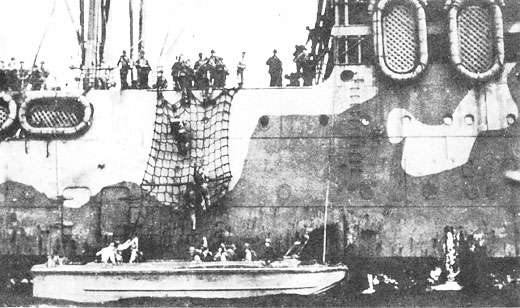
The use of scramble nets for embarkation was first tested during FLEX 3. These US Marines climb down a scramble net to an LCP(L) during preparations, in the Fiji Islands, for the Guadalcanal Campaign that would take place in August 1942.

The origins of the destroyer-transports, or APDs were not widely known at that time until it was first mentioned in an after action report when Brigadier General James J. Meade suggested destroyers might solve the dual problem of a shortage of amphibious transports and naval gunfire support. With such ships "troops could move quickly close into shore and disembark under protection of the ships' guns." The Navy apparently agreed and decided to experiment with one of its flush-deck, four-stack destroyers. It had built a large number of these during World War I and most were now in obsolete compared to the battleships that were being used as troop transports during those times. And he further concluded that the battleships can be pressed on to other naval missions instead of being relied for troop transportation. Although the APD provided lesser carrying capacity and limited ability in carrying landing crafts and heavy equipment. Of these various naval elements of APDs, the Navy detached Battleship Division One including the USS Wyoming (AG-17), USS New York (BB-34), and had USS Nevada (BB-36) added. The USS Utah (AG-16), which was reconfigured as a mobile aerial bombing target. The total amphibious landing force was composed of approximately 4,700 Army and Marine Corps personnel. While firing a scheduled secondary battery practice on board the USS Wyoming on the last day of the exercises at San Clemente Island, an explosion occurred in the #13 5-inch gun mount, killing one officer and six enlisted personnel. Thirteen other personnel were injured in the blast.

=== FLEX 4 ===
The Fleet Landing Exercise Number 4 was held from January 13 to March 15, 1938. The Fleet Marine Force returned to the Caribbean to avoid any Japanese observation. The tests were conducted on the beaches of Vieques and the main island of Puerto Rico. During these exercises, three Army National Guard regiments participated by "defending" ashore while the Marines of the 1st Brigade attempted a "mock" assault against them. It was the first time that reconnaissance elements were added to the amphibious assault, reflecting the reconnaissance doctrine outlined in the Fleet Training Publication 167. The Army's contribution climbed to three infantry regiments with supporting arms and brigade alternated in the part of landing force and shoreline defender. Brigadier General James Roosevelt, eldest son of the late President Franklin D. Roosevelt, who as a lieutenant colonel was in the Marine Corps Reserve on active duty aboard the USS Indianapolis (CA-35) during one of the reconnaissance patrols and experiments with raiding and patrolling parties. These raiding and patrolling parties would lay the ground work for the Marine Raider Bn. 1st Marine Brigade tested the concept of delivering 4-man patrols by submarines. The exercise missions were a mixed success at Vieques and Puerto Rico when two patrols were captured, but it was realized that with experience and refinement the concept held promise.

The Vieques Phase, three patrols of one Army and two Marines with four men each were assigned by Rear Admiral A. W. Johnson, Commander of the Attack Force, in reaching the beach under the cover of darkness by inflatable rafts. They launched from submarines USS S-42 (SS-153), USS S-46 (SS-157) and USS S-47 (SS-158) with intentions of conducting a reconnaissance ashore and return to the submarines the following night at certain appointed rendezvous. Four Marines from the Headquarters Company of the 1st Brigade marked the first amphibious reconnaissance patrol launching from a submarine by raft in United States history. Those four Marines reported aboard S-47 but was unsuccessful in locating the beach on Vieques.

"The weather conditions under which the night phase was carried on could not have been more adverse to a successful ship to shore movement. The heavy seas were awash the decks with every wave driven by a wind of between a force of 4 and 5 in velocity and varying direction from 70 degrees to 120 degrees which approximately paralleled the island. A brilliant full moon extended the visibility to at least 1,500 yards (1,400 m), making a close approach to the beach impossible."

The Puerto Rico Phase in the reconnaissance landing was however quite different. After sunset in the darkness, the submerged submarines navigated to 2 nautical miles (4 km) within the shoreline, following channels until it was able to reach within 1,200 yards (1,100 m) from the beach of Ponce Playa. This made it easy to discharge the patrols successfully to reach the beachhead without detection from the "enemy" zone of the Army National Guard. Although one was subsequently captured at the night of the landing.

It was again concluded that the landing force of the main landing parties were still in dispute over the landing craft. Modified fishing craft were tested and, although superior to standard naval boats in beaching and speed, their exposed rudders and screws were wont to dig in during retracting from the beach. The tests in reconnaissance added that small, inflatable air rafts were feasible in transporting reconnaissance teams onto the beaches. However, both the landing teams and recon teams agreed that communications was still a major obstacle in achieving the total success of the Fleet Landing Exercises. Means of communications were important to transmit information quickly and not waiting for it to be relayed once the troops had landed for it to be available for those who would need it.

=== FLEX 5 ===
The Fleet Landing Exercise Number 5 commenced in January through March in 1938 and 1939 on the islands of Culebra and Vieques. These exercises again were only Navy-Marine Corps cooperation as the army no longer participated. The Marine Corps successfully landed amphibious reconnaissance patrols on Vieques when two such patrols disembarked from the USS Manley (DD-74) during exercises from 13 January to 13 March 1939. The Navy reclassified Manley as a miscellaneous auxiliary (AG 28). After a few weeks of hasty work in the New York Navy Yard, the ship served as a transport for Marine units in the Caribbean. In the fall of 1939 Manley went back into the yards for a more extensive conversion. Workers removed all torpedo tubes, one gun, two boilers, and their smokestacks thus creating a hold amidships for cargo and troops. Again, the Navy reclassified the Manley to a destroyer-transport class, APD-1. The Chief of Naval Operations made conversion a priority so the ship would be available for FLEX 6 in early 1940.

The inserted reconnaissance patrols would deflate their experimental rubber boats upon reaching the shore and re-inflate to rendezvous with the awaiting submarine at a predestined point. As for the Marine assault teams they found that getting their equipment to the beachhead during an amphibious landing was a strenuous task and extremely difficult with the existing landing craft. Most of the landing boats were incapable in hauling amphibious tractors, artillery and other important supplies necessary for properly establishing an advanced base. The Marines requested the Bureau of Construction and Repair to design and build feasible landing craft, but to no avail. Soon the Marines began to express interest in a variety of different commercially produced boats. Of all these tested, the Higgins' boats became the best choice.

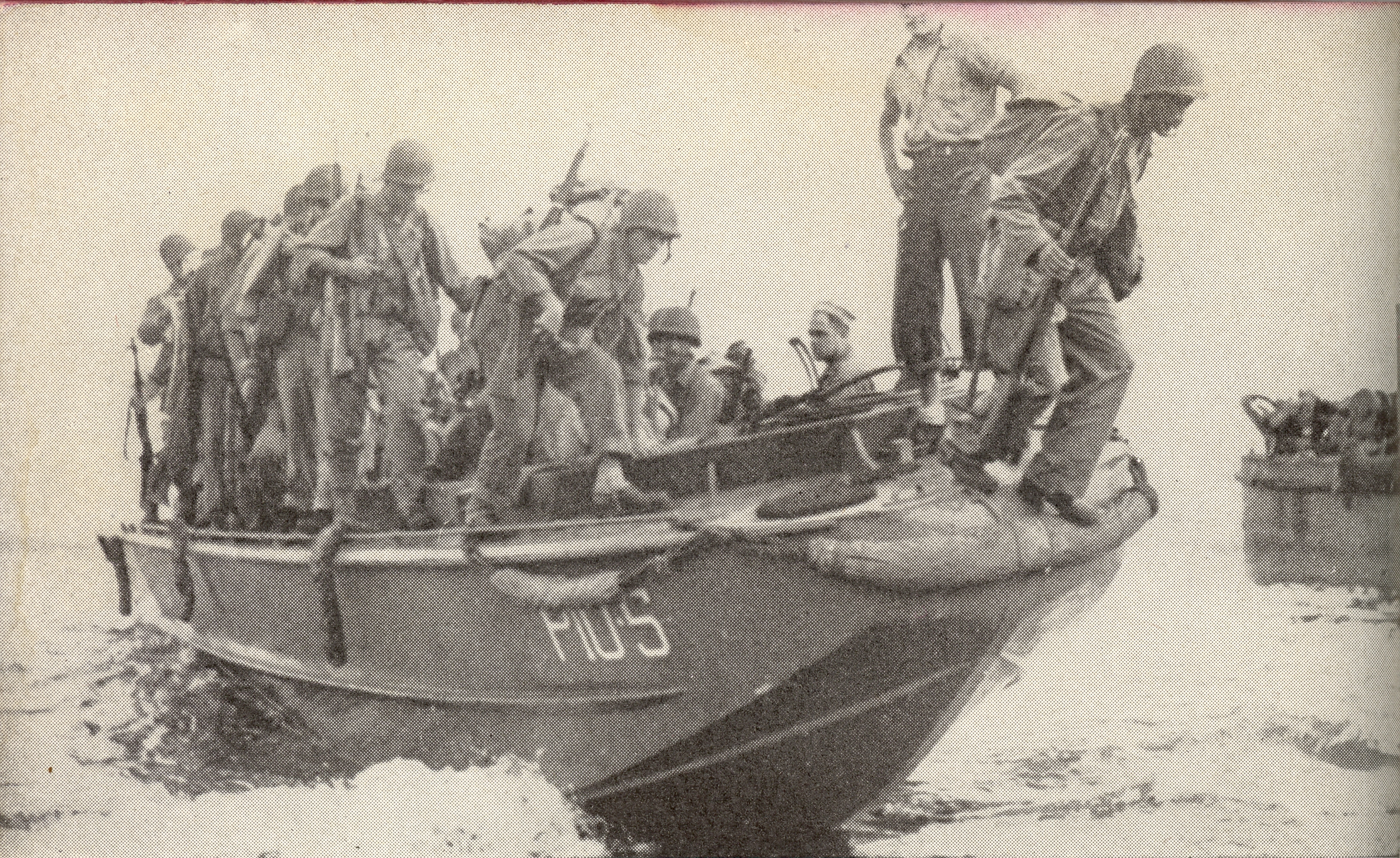

When tested during FLEX 5 by the Navy and Marine Corps, Higgins' Eureka boat surpassed the performance of the Navy-design. A drawback to the design was that equipment had to be unloaded, and men disembarked, over the bow or sides, thus exposing them more to enemy fire in combat situations. The Marine Corps requested that the boats have retractable hinged ramps at the bow-replacing the machine gun mounts; and it was adopted as the standard personnel landing craft, the Landing Craft Personnel (LCP(L)) by 1940.

=== FLEX 6 ===
Fleet Landing Exercise Number Six was the first wartime exercise in amphibious training in 1940–1941. It became clear that the Navy and Marine Corps was in dire need for amphibious transports larger than destroyers as the 1st Brigade could barely send two thousand Marines to land in the Caribbean and only adequate experimental landing craft were provided. Landing craft included two tank lighters, two artillery lighters, twenty-five special landing craft, of which twelve were the Bureau type, and eight landing skiffs. Comparative tests showed the Higgins Eureka landing craft, the 45-foot tank lighters, and rubber boats to have been the best adapted to landing operations. As a partial response to this problem, H.M. Smith seized the newly developed destroyer-transport. During FLEX 6, his plan called for the USS Manley (DD-74) to land Company A, 1st Battalion, 5th Marines via rubber boats during the night, at H-minus three hours, at a point away from the primary assault beach. This force would advance inland, seize key terrain dominating the proposed beachhead, and thus protect the main landing from counter-attack. They were the first unit to use the revamped Manley. On 23 February 1940 it used rubber boats to execute an assault landing against Culebra. In 1940, patrols were successfully infiltrating ashore and reporting information and became an accepted doctrine in amphibious reconnaissance.

=== FLEX 7 ===
A year later, during Fleet Landing Exercise Number 7, Smith had three destroyer-transports. He designated the three companies of the 7th Marines embarked on these ships as the Mobile Landing Group. During the exercise these units again made night landings, either to protect the main assault, or conducted diversionary attacks.

The 1st Marine Division was one of the first two division-sized units formed by the Corps. It was established in February 1941 aboard the USS Texas (BB-35) in Cuba around the nucleus of the First Marine Brigade. The Division's first commander was the amphibious expert, Brigadier General Holland M. Smith. There is no record of an activation ceremony since the division was deeply involved the preparations for FLEX 7. This was the last fleet landing exercise before the United States became a combatant in the Second World War.
