= Charles Sealsfield =

Austrian-American journalist

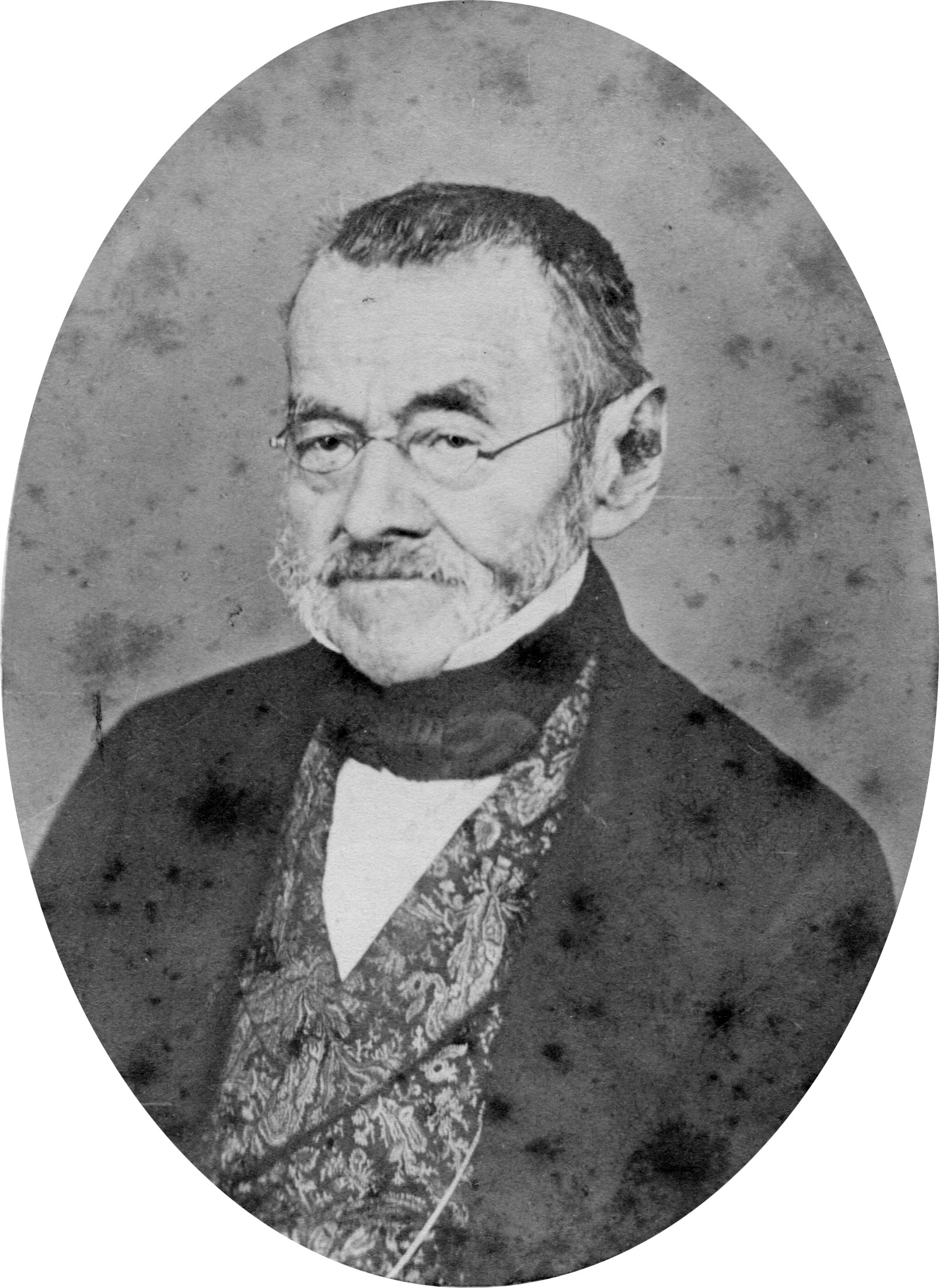
Authentic photograph of Charles Sealsfield (1793–1864)

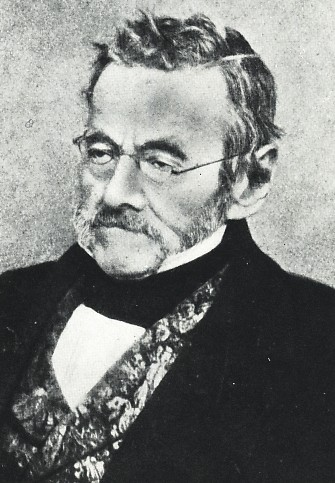
Charles Sealsfield 1864.

Charles Sealsfield was the pseudonym of Austrian-American novelist and journalist Carolus Magnus Postl (3 March 1793 – 26 May 1864). He lived in the United States from 1822 to 1826, and then again in 1828/1829. During a final stay from 1853 to 1858 he became a U.S. citizen. Sealsfield is best known for his German-language Romantic novels with American backgrounds, his travelogues, and for not revealing his identity until after his death, in his will. He returned to Europe about 1829, living in Paris and London before settling in Switzerland in 1832, where he resided for most of the rest of his life.

== Biography ==
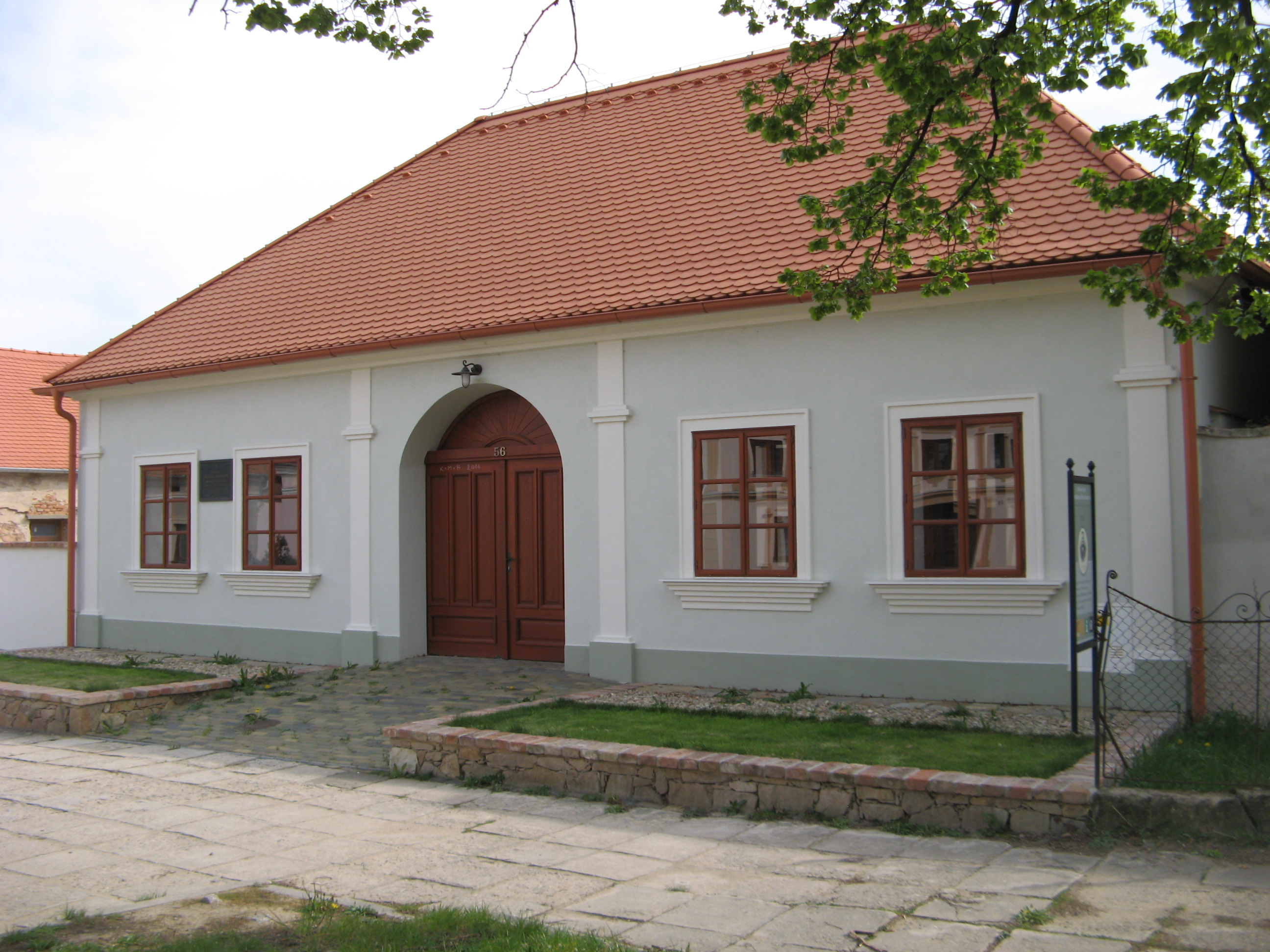
Birth house and museum of Charles Sealsfield in Popice

Carl Magnus Postl was born in Popice (Poppitz in German, now part of Znojmo) in Moravia, then part of the Habsburg Empire. His schooling completed, he entered the Knights of the Cross with the Red Star in Prague, where he became a priest. In the autumn of 1822, apparently fleeing the repressive government of Prince Klemens von Metternich (so-called Vormärz regime), he fled to the United States, where he assumed the name of Charles Sealsfield.

In 1826 he returned to Germany and published a book on America (Die Vereinigten Staaten von Nordamerika). Next he published an outspoken criticism of Austria, first in German, then adapted by Postl into English (Austria as it is, or, sketches of continental courts, by an eye-witness, 1828.) It was published anonymously in London; this book offended the Austrian authorities. The author was a wanted man in that country, but his identity remained unknown.

Meanwhile, Postl had returned to the United States, where he published his first novel, also in English, Tokeah, or the White Rose (1828; translated in German by Gustav Höcker). He became a journalist, first in New York City, where in 1829 he edited the Courier des États Unis. He traveled back to Europe, living first in Paris and then in London, making a living by his journalism and writing accounts of United States life as a correspondent for various journals.

In 1832 Postl settled in Switzerland. In 1858 he purchased a small estate in Solothurn. Here he died in May 1864. His will first revealed the fact that he was the former monk Postl.

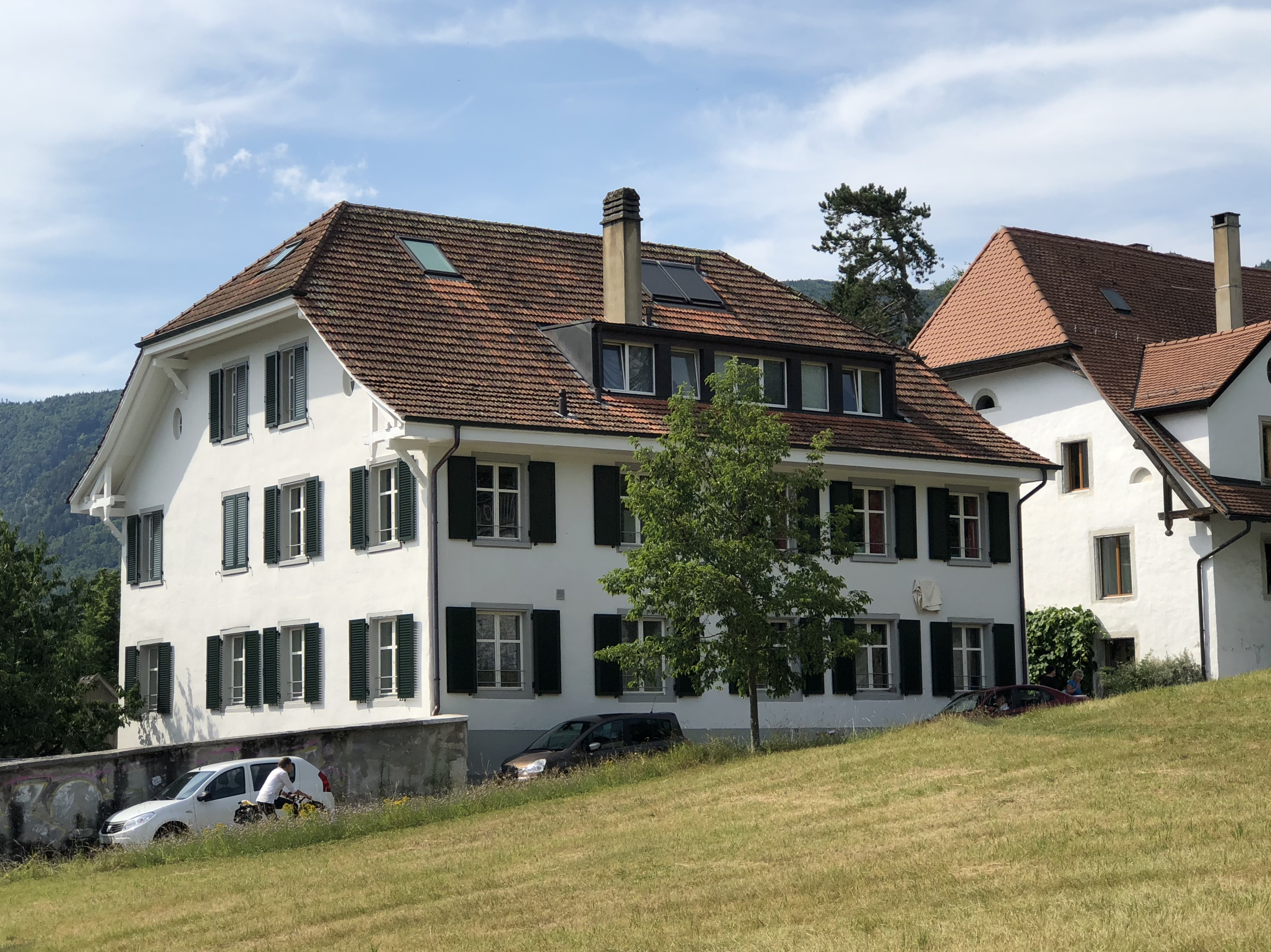
Sealsfield's cottage, Bergstrasse Solothurn, today No 49, after 1864 significantly enlarged

He is best known as a German-language novelist, although his first novel Tokeah appeared in English (1829). He published it four years later in German under the title Der Legitime und die Republikaner (1838). Next works were Der Virey und die Aristokraten oder Mexiko im Jahre 1812 (1835), Lebensbilder aus beiden Hemisphären (1835–1837), Sturm-, Land- und Seebilder (1838), Das Kajütenbuch, oder Nationale Charakteristiken (1842). Sealsfield occupies an important position in the development of the German historical novel at a period when the influence of the Scottish author, Sir Walter Scott, was beginning to wane. Postl endeavoured to widen the scope of historical fiction, to describe great national and political movements, without forfeiting the sympathy of his readers for the individual characters of the story.

In 1844, Theodor Mundt declared Sealsfield (whose name he had misread as "Seatsfield") the greatest American author. The Boston Daily Advertiser and other newspapers commenced a search for the true identity of "Seatsfield," but many believed the whole story to be a hoax. The Knickerbocker ran an elaborate satire on the affair in its June 1844 issue.

Sealsfield was the first to write literary texts about the United States in German. He presented the American republican form of government to Europeans as a political ideal and described the American landscapes in detail. In the last work he published, Die Deutsch-Amerikanischen Wahlverwandtschaften, he describes both worlds. The main character, Harry Rambleton, who comes from an old settlement in the Hudson Valley, is on a holiday in Switzerland. He returns to America on a sailing ship on a journey described in detail, moves in New York society and to the holiday resorts around Lake George (New York) and Saratoga. The novel was supposed to show a union of European and American ideals; two weddings would have symbolised this. The novel has remained a torso.

Sealsfield was an advocate for a German democracy.

Sealsfield's Gesammelte Werke (Collected Works) appeared in 18 vols. (1843–1846). A new edition of his complete works in German and English (Sämtliche Werke), chiefly in photographic facsimile, though with new introductions and editorial apparatus, was edited by Sealsfield scholar Karl J. R. Arndt and published by Olms beginning in 1972.

The Zentralbibliothek Solothurn has a large collection of editions and manuscripts. One part came from Sealsfield's friends in Solothurn, another part, the 'Sealsfield-Sammlung Kresse', was collected by a Moravian admirer of the author, Albert Kresse (1886–1961).

== Works ==
1. Die Vereinigten Staaten von Nordamerika, nach ihrem politischen, religiösen und gesellschaftlichen Verhältnisse betrachtet. Mit einer Reise durch den westlichen Theil von Pennsylvanien, Ohio, Kentucky, Indiana, Illinois, Missouri, Tennessee, das Gebiet Arkansas, Mississippi und Louisiana. 2 vol. Stuttgart u. Tübingen: Cotta 1827.
2. The United States of North America as they are in their political, religious, and social relations. London: Simpkin & Marshall 1828 (translation of German original, vol 1).
3. The Americans As They Are: Described in a Tour through the Valleys of the Mississippi. London: Hurst, Chance 1828 (translation of German original, vol 2).
4. Austria as it is, or sketches of continental courts, by an eye-witness. London: Hurst, Chance 1828.
5. Tokeah; or the White Rose. 2 vol. Philadelphia: Carey, Lea & Carey 1829. Revised version: The Indian chief; or, Tokeah and the White Rose. A tale of the Indians and Whites. 3 vol. Philadelphia: Carey, Lea & Carey 1829; London: Newman 1829.
6. Der Legitime und die Republikaner. Eine Geschichte aus dem letzten amerikanisch-englischen Krieg. 3 vol. Zürich: Orell, Füssli 1833.
7. Transatlantische Reiseskizzen und Christophorus Bärenhäuter. 2 vol. Zürich: Orell, Füssli 1834.
8. Der Virey und die Aristokraten oder Mexiko im Jahre 1812. 3 vol. Zürich: Orell, Füssli 1835.
9. Lebensbilder aus beiden Hemisphären: Die grosse Tour. 2 vol. Zürich: Orell, Füssli 1835.
10. Lebensbilder aus beiden Hemisphären, dritter Theil: Ralph Doughby’s Esq. Brautfahrt oder Der transatlantischen Reiseskizzen dritter Theil. Zürich: Orell, Füssli 1835.
11. Lebensbilder aus beiden Hemisphären, vierter Theil: Pflanzerleben oder Der transatlantischen Reiseskizzen vierter Theil. Zürich: Schulthess 1836.
12. Lebensbilder aus beiden Hemisphären, fünfter Theil: Die Farbigen oder Der transatlantischen Reiseskizzen fünfter Theil. Zürich: Schulthess 1836.
13. Lebensbilder aus beiden Hemisphären, sechster Theil und Nathan, der Squatter-Regulator, oder Der erste Amerikaner in Texas. Der transatlantischen Reiseskizzen sechster Theil. Zürich: Schulthess 1836.
14. Neue Land- und Seebilder: Die Deutsch-Amerikanischen Wahlverwandtschaften. 4 vol. Zürich: Schulthess 1839/40.
15. Das Cajütenbuch oder Nationale Charakteristiken. 2 vol. Zürich: Schulthess 1841.
16. Süden und Norden. 3 vol. Stuttgart: Metzler 1842/43.
17. Gesammelte Werke. 18 vol. Stuttgart: Metzler 1843–46.
