= Zentralbibliothek Solothurn =

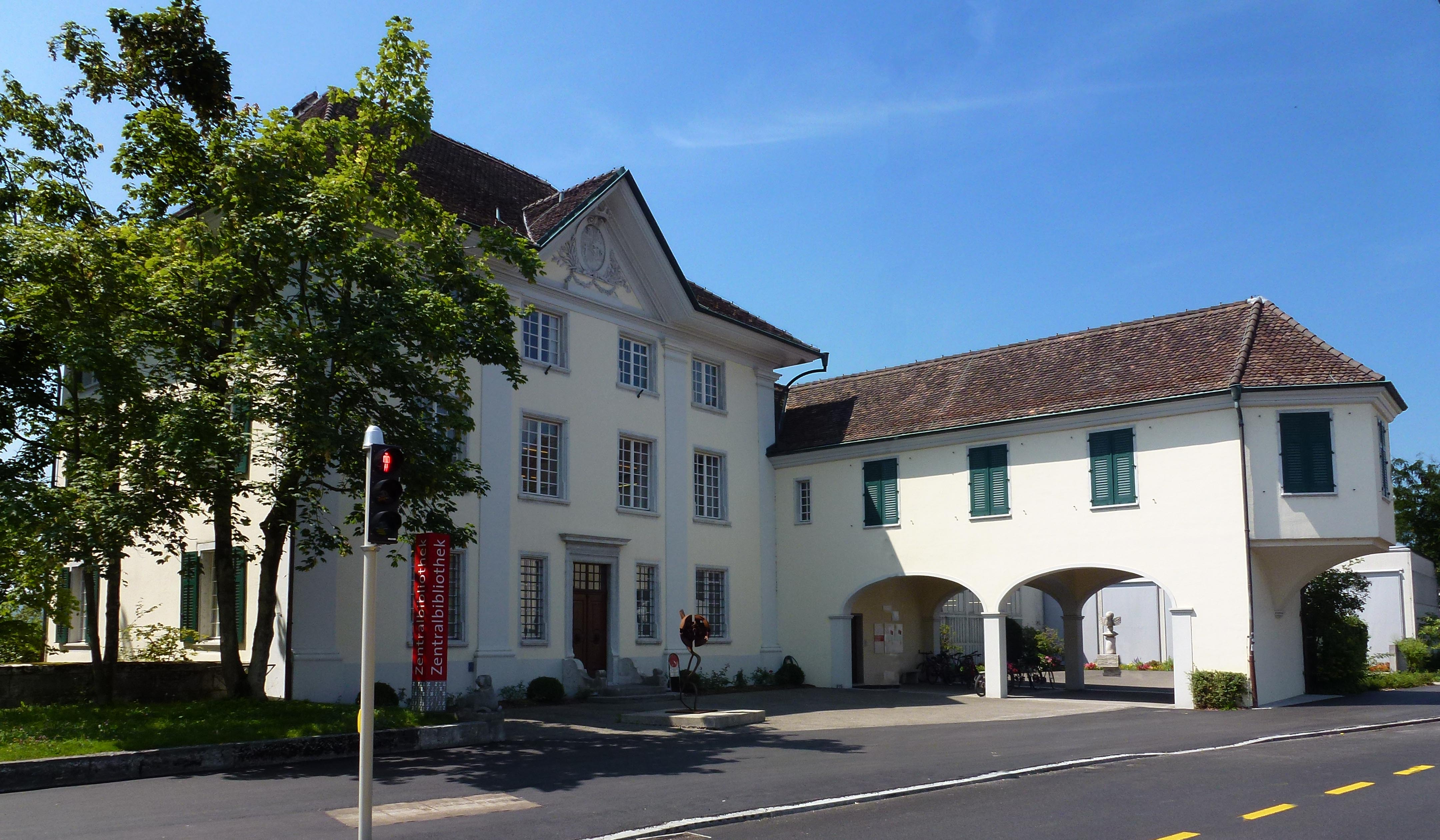
- View from Bielstrasse
- 47.209722°N 7.529722°E
- Location: Solothurn, Switzerland
- Type: Public library Cantonal library
- Established: 1930

Collection
- Items collected: Books, newspapers, magazines, sheet music, sound and music recordings, maps, prints, drawings, manuscripts, photographs
- Size: 1 million items
- Criteria for collection: Materials pertaining to the canton of Solothurn (Solodorensia), history and literature

Access and use
- Access requirements: Reading rooms – free. One-time fee for registration.

Other information
- Director: Amir Bernstein
- Website: www.zbsolothurn.ch

Zentralbibliothek Solothurn (Solothurn Central Library) is a library in Solothurn, Switzerland. It is a public library serving the city and the region of Solothurn as well as a cantonal library housing historical collections including manuscripts, incunabula, early prints, art prints, photographs, and maps.

== History ==
Zentralbibliothek Solothurn (ZBS) was established in 1930 from the merger of the then Stadtbibliothek (municipal library) and Kantonsbibliothek (cantonal library) of Solothurn.

=== Municipal library ===
The origins of Solothurn's municipal library lie in the library of the Ökonomische Gesellschaft (Economic Society), founded in 1761 by chaplain Franz Jakob Hermann. Donations by members of Solothurn's patrician families to the Ökonomische Gesellschaft as well as to the city council led to the creation of the Hochobrigkeitliche Bibliothek (government library) in 1763 by the city council, also managed by Hermann. The library at first was museum-like, open only for a few hours per week, and books were only loaned to members of the donor families. Until 1798, the collection was located in a library room in the city hall. During the Helvetic Republic period (1798–1803), its authorities used the room for other purposes, and the books were put into storage. The library reopened in 1807 on the ground floor of a former Franciscan friary.

During the subsequent Restoration period, use of the library was strictly regulated. Censorship and the introduction of a clerical supervisor led to the head librarian, historian Robert Glutz-Blotzheim, resigning from his post. This changed in 1838, after the liberal revolution. A new regulation issued by the liberal city administration opened the library to free public use, and more funds for book acquisitions were granted. The library operated as a public library from that point until its 1930 merger with the cantonal library.

=== Cantonal library ===
At the peak of Switzerland's "Kulturkampf" in the 1870s, several monasteries and collegiate churches were dissolved by the cantonal authorities. As their libraries were seized by the canton, these collections were merged into a newly founded cantonal library, opened in 1883. Among other collections that were integrated into the new institution were a military library and the chancellery's library. The library was further enlarged in the following decades by acquisitions such as the libraries of Friedrich Fiala, bishop of Basel, and the former Franciscan friar Franz Louis Studer.

=== Zentralbibliothek (Central Library) ===
In October 1929, the Cantonal Council of Solothurn decided to merge the municipal library and the cantonal library into a foundation under public law as Zentralbibliothek Solothurn. After the 1930 merger, a design by architect Hans Zaugg for a new building won the architecture competition, but was controversial due to its modernist design. The situation changed when the municipality of Solothurn acquired a late 17th century mansion (a summer house used by patrician families) on Bielstrasse for which its deceased owner, Emil R. Zetter, had granted favorable terms of purchase in his will, on the condition that the building would be used for a library or for another public purpose. This location was chosen for the Central Library, which opened there with a modern annex to the old Zetterhaus building in 1958, designed by architects Gebrüder Pfister from Zurich.

The 1958 building houses an open-access library, the reading room, a children's library, office rooms, as well as several floors of closed stacks. The historic Zetterhaus or Gibelin-Zetter-Haus has a self-service café on the ground floor and an open-access part of the music collection (recordings on CD, sheet music) on the first floor. An extension of the Zetterhaus is used for events and as a meeting room; it originally housed the children's library and from 1985 a book museum. The book museum closed in 2012 for conservational reasons. An underground expansion to the closed stacks, specifically for rare materials, was built in 2014. Also in 2014, the library joined the Cooperative Storage Library Switzerland which opened in 2016.

Zentralbibliothek Solothurn is a member of the Swiss Library Service Platform (SLSP) network and its union catalogue Swisscovery since 2020. The library is also participating in the Swisscollections search gateway for special collections.

==== Directors ====
ZBS directors from its founding:

- 1930–1935 Josef Walker
- 1936–1962 Leo Altermatt
- 1962–1983 Hans Sigrist
- 1984–1998 Rolf Max Kully
- 1998–2002 Christine Holliger
- 2002–2016 Verena Bider and Peter Probst as co-directors
- 2016–2019 Verena Bider
- 2019–2024 Yvonne Leimgruber
- from 2025 (2024 ad interim) Amir Bernstein

== Collections ==
The ZBS collection contains about one million media units. The library's main mandate is the preservation of Solothurn's cultural heritage, Solodorensia – publications with a topical connection to the city or the canton of Solothurn, works by Solothurn authors, illustrators, artists, and musicians, as well as works published in the canton of Solothurn. Printed or electronically published Solodorensia on the topics of regional history and geography are recorded in the Solothurner Bibliografie.

In the children's library, about 30,000 media units are available in open access, older works are available from the closed stacks.

As a cantonal and municipal library, but also as a research library, Zentralbibliothek Solothurn collects Solodorensia, with an additional focus on Helvetica (literature from and about Switzerland), history and literature, children's literature, sound recordings, sheet music, music literature, and audiovisual media. Alongside Geneva's Phonothèques municipales, the collection of about 65,000 lendable recordings of music is considered the largest of its kind in Switzerland. The acquisition of new music recordings has ceased in 2020, except for Solodorensia music by creators from the canton, or published in the canton of Solothurn.

=== Special collections ===
The historical book collections – largely originating in the predecessor libraries –, include more than 1000 incunabula. The Handbuch der historischen Buchbestände in der Schweiz (2011) puts the size of the historical collections at about 80,000 volumes. There are about 100 medieval manuscripts, as well as a larger collection of early modern manuscripts, collections of letters and other documents. Among more recent additions are the library of the former Capuchin friary of Solothurn which closed in 2003 due to the dwindling number of Capuchin friars, and the historical part of the library of the Capuchin friary of Olten (closed in 2024).

The library houses also historical maps, art prints, photographs, postcards, music scores, as well as special collections such as Rosa Muggli's collection of letters and drawings by Hermann Hesse, and an ex libris collection. Through an acquisition in 1982 (Sammlung Kresse), the library came into possession of the world's largest collection of material on Austrian-American writer Charles Sealsfield (1793–1864) who spent the last years of his life in Solothurn. Other collections include Nachlass materials of composers and writers from the canton of Solothurn.

== Digital services ==
As a public library, Zentralbibliothek Solothurn offers access to online platforms such as ebookplus (Onleihe), OverDrive, Munzinger, and PressReader. A selection of digitized material from the library's special collections is available through the platforms e-rara.ch, e-manuscripta, and e-codices. The library also participates in Memoriav's platform Memobase for audiovisual media (two collections of photographs by Solothurn photographers as of January 2026), and has uploaded parts of its digitized graphics and photo collections to Wikimedia Commons.

== Access to municipal archives ==
The municipal archives of Solothurn (Stadtarchiv) contains mainly documents created after the administrative separation of the city and the canton of Solothurn in 1830. Older documents of the then city-state of Solothurn are located in the cantonal archives (Staatsarchiv). A part of the municipal archives was stored in Zentralbibliothek Solothurn from 1969. Reorganized in 2012, the municipal archives moved to a new location close to the ZBS. Access and assistance for patrons of the municipal archives is provided by the library.
