= Colonia Hocker =

Coordinates: 32°05′S 58°20′W

- Municipality and village
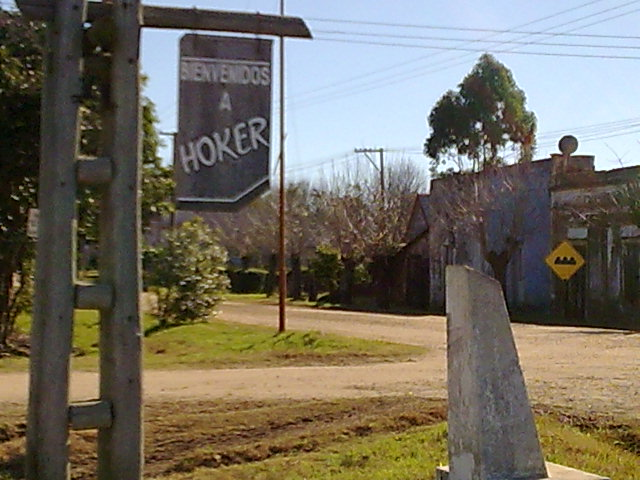
- Interactive map of Colonia Hocker
- Country: Argentina
- Province: Entre Ríos Province
- Time zone: UTC−3 (ART)

Colonia Hocker is a village and municipality in Entre Ríos Province in north-eastern Argentina.
