= Hocker (sport) =

American team sport

Hocker is a team sport developed in Fairfield, Connecticut, by attorney John Henry Norton. He first devised it in the late 1950s, then spent a decade refining it, then sought to promote it in the 1970s. He built a dedicated field on his property and hosted a weekly game there with his family and often a small crowd of participants and onlookers. The nearby Southport, Connecticut, chapter of the Boy's Club of America began a league for players ages 11 to 15, and by 1977 the Boy's Club league had spread to more than 1,100 affiliated clubs. Additionally, the sport came to be played in school systems in Connecticut, California, and Florida, and appeared as an intramural sport or clinic at several colleges, including the University of Bridgeport, Southern Connecticut State, and Miami-Dade Junior College.

Norton, the father of 14 children (including five who were adopted), wanted to create a sport they could all play together, both boys and girls, despite their various ages, sizes, and skill levels. It was also important to him that it be a sport he would play with them: "When kids are small, it is difficult to find a game you can play with them that they can be successful at right away, and that you can enjoy playing, too."

Hocker is fast-moving and has simple rules. It is played with a 16-inch rubber ball (which can be smaller) on a field approximately the size of a football field (though sources conflict on the exact dimensions). Two teams consist of nine players each. The field is enclosed in a fence to ensure the ball stays inside, in play at all times. The ball can be dribbled as in soccer or basketball, kicked, punched, or headbutted, but not carried. The goals are 18 feet wide and nine feet high, similar to soccer goals, although they have a double cross-bar at the top. The additional space created by the double bar is divided into two rectangles and a center square. The number of points awarded for a goal varies from one to five; placing the ball through the largest area of the goal scores one point, the smaller rectangles above are worth three points, and the smallest area, the square, awards five points. A set ends when a team has scored seven points. A short game is won when a team wins two out of three sets; a long game is won by three out of five sets.

By the summer of 1977, with the Boys Club league well established and the sport expanding to colleges, Norton attempted to attract corporate sponsors, which he believed would spread the sport worldwide. A federation, Hocker Federation International, was founded, and hocker was noted in 1977 to have been played by 100,000 people in the United States, as well as in countries such as Australia, Taiwan and Brazil. By 1979, inter-college competitions had been set up, and hocker was played in the Special Olympics. It was also played by Bruce Jenner on a 1978 episode of Good Morning America. It is no longer widely played.

Three of Horton's children sought careers in professional tennis, including Beth Norton, who performed notably at the 1976 US Open.
