= Paul Oskar Höcker =

German editor and author (1865–1944)

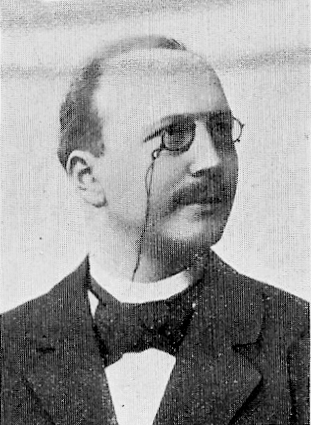
- Born: 17 December 1865; Meiningen
- Died: 6 May 1944 (aged 78)
- Education: Berlin University of the Arts
- Occupations: Editor and author
- Children: Karla Höcker
- Relatives: Oskar Höcker
- Writing career
- Pen name: Heinz Grevenstett
- Genres: Comedies, crime novels, historical novels, memoirs, and children's books
- Notable work: Gottgesandte Wechselwinde

Paul Oskar Höcker (17 December 1865 – 6 May 1944) was a German editor and author, who also wrote under the pseudonym Heinz Grevenstett. He was one of the 88 signatories of the 1933 proclamation of loyalty to Adolf Hitler, the Gelöbnis treuester Gefolgschaft.

== Biography ==
Paul Oskar Höcker was born the third son of author and actor Oskar Höcker in Meiningen, in the Duchy of Saxe-Meiningen. He was raised in Karlsruhe, where his father was engaged to the court of Baden. At the age of 19, in 1884, he moved to Berlin, where he graduated secondary school.

That same year he enrolled at the Berlin University of the Arts and until 1888 studied composition. From 1888 to 1889 he performed his military service, and in 1893 married Margarete Linke.

In 1908 he had a house built in Westend, Berlin (Lindenallee 21) by architect Emilie Winkelmann in the Italian country house style, the Landhausstil. In 1928-1929 he had another house built, nearby in the Nussbaumallee 8, by Alfred Gellhorn, with a garden designed by Gustav Allinger. He wrote comedies, crime novels, historical novels, memoirs, and children's books. A prolific and successful author, some of his novels were adapted for the movies. He was the father of musician and author Karla Höcker.

== Early writing career, World War I ==
In the beginning of the twentieth century he wrote a number of Leatherstocking Tales for children in the vein of James Fenimore Cooper, and attracted attention in the United States; The Pittsburg Press, in a short biographical article published in 1905, describes him as the author of "delightfully humorous stories." During World War I he was a captain in the Landwehr in Lille, France. He wrote of his experiences in the first three months of the war in An der Spitze meiner Kompagnie. Drei Monate Kriegserlebnisse (Berlin: 1919), which drew attention in the US: The New York Times praised the "admirable pen-pictures of life at the front" by "one of Germany's most popular writers"; the paper also reported on other adventures by Höcker at the front, translating and printing his letters detailing war experiences. From 1914 to 1918 he was the publisher of the Liller Kriegszeitung, and in 1917 published his war memoirs, Ein Liller Roman.

== Nazi period ==
After the Nazi Party came to power, he was one of the 88 German authors who signed the Gelöbnis treuester Gefolgschaft, in which the undersigned promised their "most loyal obedience" to Adolf Hitler. This did not hinder Nazi authorities to take a dismissing view of "nationalist kitsch from the feathers of the Gleichschaltarios, opportunists and fellow travelers who are watering down the National Revolution (of the likes of Paul Oskar Höcker)". His autobiography, published in 1940 as Gottgesandte Wechselwinde, was banned in 1948 by the authorities of the Soviet occupation zone. He died in Rastatt, in 1944.

== Books authored (selection) ==
=== Novels ===
- Geldheiraten. Berlin: Hillger, 1897.
- Argusaugen. Berlin: Hillger, 1898.
- Vor dem Kriegsgericht. Berlin: Hillger, 1900.
- Frühlingsstürme. Stuttgart: Engelhorn, 1904.
- Lebende Bilder. Stuttgart: Engelhorn, 1911.
- Das goldene Schiff. Stuttgart: Engelhorn, 1911.
- Kleine Mama. Berlin: Ullstein, 1913.
- Musikstudenten. Stuttgart: Engelhorn, 1913.
- Der ungekrönte König. Stuttgart: Engelhorn, 1913.
- Die indische Tänzerin. Stuttgart: Engelhorn, 1914.
- Das Volk in Waffen Vaterländisches Liederspiel in 4 Bildern. Berlin: Ullstein, 1914.
- Die junge Exzellenz. Berlin: Ullstein, 1915.
- Zwischen den Zeilen. Ein Roman in Briefen. Stuttgart: Engelhorn, 1916.
- Die lachende Maske. Stuttgart: Engelhorn, 1917.
- Das glückliche Eiland. Berlin: Ullstein, 1919.
- Fasching. Berlin: Ullstein, 1920.
- Der Held des Abends. Berlin: Scherl, 1921.
- Don Juans Frau. Stuttgart: Engelhorn, 1921.
- Der Mann von der Straße. Berlin: Ullstein, 1922.
- Heimatlust. Ein Roman aus der alten Potsdamer Geheimratswelt. Berlin: Ullstein, 1922.
- Die blonde Gefahr. Berlin: Ullstein, 1923.
- Die kleine Tutt und ihre Liebhaber. Berlin: Ullstein, 1923.
- Modell Sirene. Berlin: Scherl, 1925.
- Dicks Erziehung zum Gentleman, Roman, Berlin: Scherl, 1925.
- Die Frau am Quell. Der Roman einer Tänzerin, Berlin: Scherl, 1926.
- Im Hintergrund der schöne Fritz, Roman. Berlin: Ullstein, 1928.
- Die Sonne von St. Moritz. Berlin: Ullstein, 1928.
- Wirbelsturm auf Kuba. Berlin: Scherl, 1928.
- Die Meisterspionin. Berlin: Scherl, 1929.
- Wintersport. Bielefeld: Velhagen u. Klasing, 1929.
- Der Preisgekrönte. Berlin: Ullstein, 1930.
- Die sieben Stufen. Berlin: Scherl, 1930.
- Den Dritten heirat' ich einmal. Berlin: Scherl, 1931.
- Dina und der kleine Herzog. Berlin: Scherl, 1932.
- Bettina auf der Schaukel. Berlin: Scherl, 1934.
- Die reizendste Frau - außer Johanna. Roman aus der Zeit Bismarcks. Berlin: Scherl, 1935.
- Die Zietenhusaren. Roman aus der Zeit Friedrichs des Großen. Berlin: Scherl, 1936.
- Königin von Hamburg. Berlin: Scherl, 1937.
- Ich liebe dich. Ein Grieg-Roman. Berlin: Scherl, 1940.

=== Short stories ===
- Wie Schorschel Bopfinger auf Abwege geriet, Geschichten, Stuttgart: Engelhorn, 1922.

=== Memoirs ===
- An der Spitze meiner Kompagnie. Drei Monate Kriegserlebnisse, Berlin u.a.: Ullstein, 1914. (War memoir)
- Ein Liller Roman. 1917. (War memoir)
- Die Stadt in Ketten, Ein neuer Liller Roman. Berlin: Ullstein, 1918.
- Kinderzeit. Berlin: Ullstein, 1919. (Childhood memoir)
- Gottgesandte Wechselwinde. Lebenserinnerungen eines Fünfundsiebzigjährigen, Bielefeld: Velhagen u. Klasing, 1940. (Autobiography)

=== Other ===
- Finnland. Bielefeld u. Leipzig, Velhagen u. Klasing, 1923. (Popular history and geography)
- Schloßmusik auf Favorite, Berlin: Scherl, 1943.

== Selected filmography ==
- The Prisoner (1920)
- Tannenberg (1932)

== Sources ==
- Paul Höcker in the Neue Deutsche Biographie
- Paul Oskar Höcker in the German National Library
