= Willie Kavanaugh Hocker =

Designer of the Flag of Arkansas

- Born: July 21, 1862; Madison County, Kentucky, U.S.
- Died: February 6, 1944 (aged 81); Jefferson County, Arkansas, U.S.
- Resting place: Bellwood Cemetery, Pine Bluff, Arkansas, U.S. 34°13′55.4″N 92°01′33.5″W
- Occupations: Schoolteacher; poet
- Known for: Flag design

Willie Kavanaugh Hocker (July 21, 1862 – February 6, 1944) was an American schoolteacher and designer of the Arkansas state flag.

== Biography ==
Willie Kavanaugh Hocker was born in Madison County, Kentucky. Her father was a farmer. She and her family moved to Arkansas in 1870. After obtaining a teaching certificate in 1887, she taught school at Wabbaseka, Arkansas. Hocker died at her home in Jefferson County on February 6, 1944, at the age of 81.

== Arkansas flag ==
Hocker flag proposal (1912)

Hocker was a member of the Pine Bluff chapter of the Daughters of the American Revolution. Her chapter wanted to present the newly commissioned USS Arkansas with a state flag; however the chapter was informed that a state flag did not exist at all. Hocker, along with other citizens, sent flag designs to Earle W. Hodges, who was the Secretary of State. She proposed a red flag with a white diamond surrounded by a border of blue, 25 white stars in the blue and three blue stars inside the white diamond. The flag design committee suggested adding the name "Arkansas" to the flag. Hocker agreed; thus the first design of the state flag was born. After some changes to add a fourth blue star to the flag, to represent Arkansas's membership in the Confederate States, the final design was set in 1924.

== See also ==
- List of people from Kentucky
