= Oskar Höcker =

German writer and actor (1840–1894)

Oskar Höcker (13 June 1840 – 8 April 1894) was a German author of historical novels for children and a stage actor.

== Biography ==
Oskar Höcker was born in a suburb of Eilenburg, in the Prussian Province of Saxony, as was his brother, author Gustav Höcker. He was educated in Chemnitz.

At the age of 19 he became an apprentice actor with F.W. Porth, a well-established actor for the royal court in Dresden, Kingdom of Saxony. He performed in Bremen, Rostock, Reichenberg, Stettin, Meiningen, and from 1866 to 1882 at the court in Karlsruhe. In 1883 his career shifted to Berlin, where he played on all the big stages and was a member of the Deutsches Theater. Oscar Blumenthal referred to him as one of the company's most players, and critic Otto Brahm praised his "discrete art," comparing him to Josef Kainz. He later joined the Lessing Theater.

To support his ever-increasing family (he had ten children) he began a second career as writer of children's books, and after 1870 published regularly for the well-known publisher Arnold Hirt of Leipzig. Especially in the south of Germany his books (which came to be known as Höckerle) became very popular. In many of the books he authored he attempted to educate young readers in the history of the Christian church and the cultural history of Germany. His magnum opus is a series of five cycles of historical novels, totaling 20 volumes, on the development of the German bourgeoisie, Frederick II of Prussia and the history of Prussia, the Imperial German Navy, the history of Germany since the Reformation, and the history of Christianity. He died from a nervous condition at the height of his theatrical and publishing career, in Berlin. His son, Paul Oskar Höcker, also became a writer.

== Books authored (selection) ==
- Soldatenleben im Kriege. Eine Erzählung aus Deutschlands jüngster Vergangenheit. Stuttgart: Schmidt u. Spring, 1871.
- Aus Moltkes Leben. Unterm Halbmonde. Historische Erzählung aus der Zeit der Wanderjahre eines deutschen Kriegshelden während seines Aufenthaltes im Osmanischen Reiche. Leipzig: Spamer, 1873.
- General von Werder, der Vertheidiger Süddeutschlands. Bielefeld: Velhagen u. Klasing, 1874.
- Du sollst Deinen Bruder nicht hassen in Deinem Herzen! (3. Mos. 19, 17.). Eine schwedische Dorfgeschichte, der reiferen Jugend erzählt. Stuttgart: Schmidt u Spring, 1874.
- Die Rache ist mein! (5. Mos. 32, 35.). Eine Geschichte aus unserer Zeit, den Jungen und Alten erzählt. Stuttgart: Schmidt u. Spring, 1875.
- Die Lüge ist ein häßlicher Schandfleck (Sir. 20, 26). Eine lehrreiche Erzählung für Knaben und Mädchen. Stuttgart: Schmidt u. Spring, 1878.
- Der Marschall Vorwärts und sein getreuer Piepenmeister. Historische Erzählung aus der Zeit der deutschen Befreiungkriege. Leipzig: Spamer, 1880.
- Elternlos. Erzählung für die Jugend, 1880.
- Dämonen im Bauernhof. Eine Schwarzwälder Dorfgeschichte der reiferen Jugend und dem Volke erzählt. Düsseldorf: Bagel, 1882.
- Jesus, meine Zuversicht! Erzählung aus der Zeit des großen Kurfürsten. Düsseldorf: Bagel, 1883.
- Schulstube und Schlachtfeld. Eine Erzählung für die Jugend. Düsseldorf: Bagel, 1883.
- Preußens Heer - Preußens Ehr! Militär- und kulturgeschichtliche Bilder aus drei Jahrhunderten. Leipzig: Hirt, 1883.
- William Shakespeare und Altengland. Kulturhistorische Erzählung aus der Regierungszeit Elisabeths. Berlin: Ebhardt, 1884.
- Unter dem Joche der Cäsaren. Kulturgeschichtliche Erzählung aus der Zeit des Kaisers Hadrian und den Tagen des Verfalls Judäa’s. Leipzig: Hirt, 1884.
- Bilder aus dem Städteleben Augsburgs und Nürnbergs. Leipzig: Wigand, 1884.
- Merksteine deutschen Bürgertums. Kulturgeschichtliche Bilder aus dem Mittelalter. Leipzig: Hirt, 1886.
- Der Storchenbauer. Eine Dorfgeschichte aus dem badischen Schwarzwald für die Jugend. Stuttgart: Schmidt u. Spring, 1886.
- Ein deutscher Apostel. Leipzig: Hirt, 1887. Tr. in Dutch as De Duitsche Heiden-Apostel, Rotterdam: Wenk & Birkhoff, 1902.
- Kaiser Friedrich als Prinz, Feldherr und Herrscher. Berlin: Leo, 1888.
- Fürs Vaterland! Eine Geschichte aus Deutschlands größten Tagen. Stuttgart: Schmidt u. Spring, 1888.
- Die Turmkäte von Köln. Erzählung aus dem rheinischen Kaufmannsleben im 16. Jahrhundert. Berlin: Mehring, 1888.
- Spare in der Zeit, so hast Du in der Not. Eine Erzählung aus dem oberschlesischen Volksleben. Woywod, Breslau 1891.
- Das Kind des Seiltänzers. Eine Erzählung für die liebe Jugend. Stuttgart: Schmidt u. Spring, 1893.

=== Reprints ===
- Robinson Crusoe. Nach der Defoe'schen Erzählung. Reprint of the fifth edition (Berlin: Meidinger 1895). Wolfenbüttel: Melchior, 2007. ISBN 978-3-939791-14-0.
