= Gustav Höcker =

German writer (1832–1911)

Gustav Höcker (28 September 1832 - 11 October 1911) was a German author and translator of popular historical novels.

== Biography ==
Gustav Höcker was born on 28 September 1832 in a suburb of Eilenburg. His father was a colorist in the textile industry, and his younger brother was Oskar Höcker, who also became a writer. He spent his childhood in Eilenburg, an early industrial center, and received his secondary education in Chemnitz. Until the age of 26 he was, against his will, a merchant (in 1862 he published Kaufmännische Carrieren: Wahrheit und Dichtung aus dem Geschäftsleben, inspired by his career in trade), an occupation he left to become a professional writer.

Höcker made a name for himself as a writer of narratives, many of which recount the events of the nineteenth century. He published studies and biographies of drama authors and politicians, and of musicians such as Ludwig van Beethoven, Joseph Haydn, and Wolfgang Amadeus Mozart. A book with "simply written life-stories" on Haydn, Joseph Haydn: a study of his life and time for youth, was translated into English and published in Chicago in 1907. He also wrote crime novels and assisted his brother Oskar, himself a prolific writer. He was influenced by Charles Dickens, besides Karl Gutzkow and Ferdinand Stolle. He spent much of his life in Karlsruhe, and died in Breslau on 11 October 1911.

He attained a measure of commercial success with adaptations of novels in English, including novels by James Fenimore Cooper (The Deerslayer and two collections of adapted "Leatherstocking Tales"), Robert Montgomery Bird (Nick of the Woods), and Daniel Defoe (Robinson Crusoe). His version of Charles Sealsfield's Tokeah, or the White Rose was only one of many German versions of the late 1890s.

== Books authored (selection) ==
- Kaufmännische Carrieren: Wahrheit und Dichtung aus dem Geschäftsleben. Dresden: Rudolf Kuntze, 1862.
- Geld und Frauen: Erzählungen von Gustav Höcker. Jena: Hermann Costenoble, 1867.
- Wolfgang Amadeus Mozart. Glogau: Flemming, 1898.
- Das grosse Dreigestirn: Haydn, Mozart, Beethoven. Glogau: Flemming, [1898].
- Die vorbilder der deutschen schauspielkunst. Glogau: Flemming, 1899.
- Zwei Jahren Deutschen Heldenthums. Glogau: Flemming, 1906.
- Jena und Auerstädt: ein geschichtlicher Rückblick auf Preussens Unglückstage. Leipzig: Carl Siwinna, 1907.
- Joseph Haydn: a study of his life and time for youth. Trans. in English by George P. Upton. Chicago: A.C. McClurg, 1907.
- Arnold of Winkelried. Trans. in English by George P. Upton. Life Stories for Young People, 1908.

=== Translations and adaptations ===
- Der Wildtöter. Trans. of James Fenimore Cooper, The Deerslayer. Stuttgart, Berlin, Leipzig: Union Deutsche Verlagsanstalt, 1880.
- Tokeah. Trans. and adaptation of Charles Sealsfield, Tokeah, or the White Rose. Stuttgart, Berlin, Leipzig: Union Deutsche Verlagsanstalt, [1890s].
