= New York-class battleship =

Dreadnought battleship class of the United States Navy

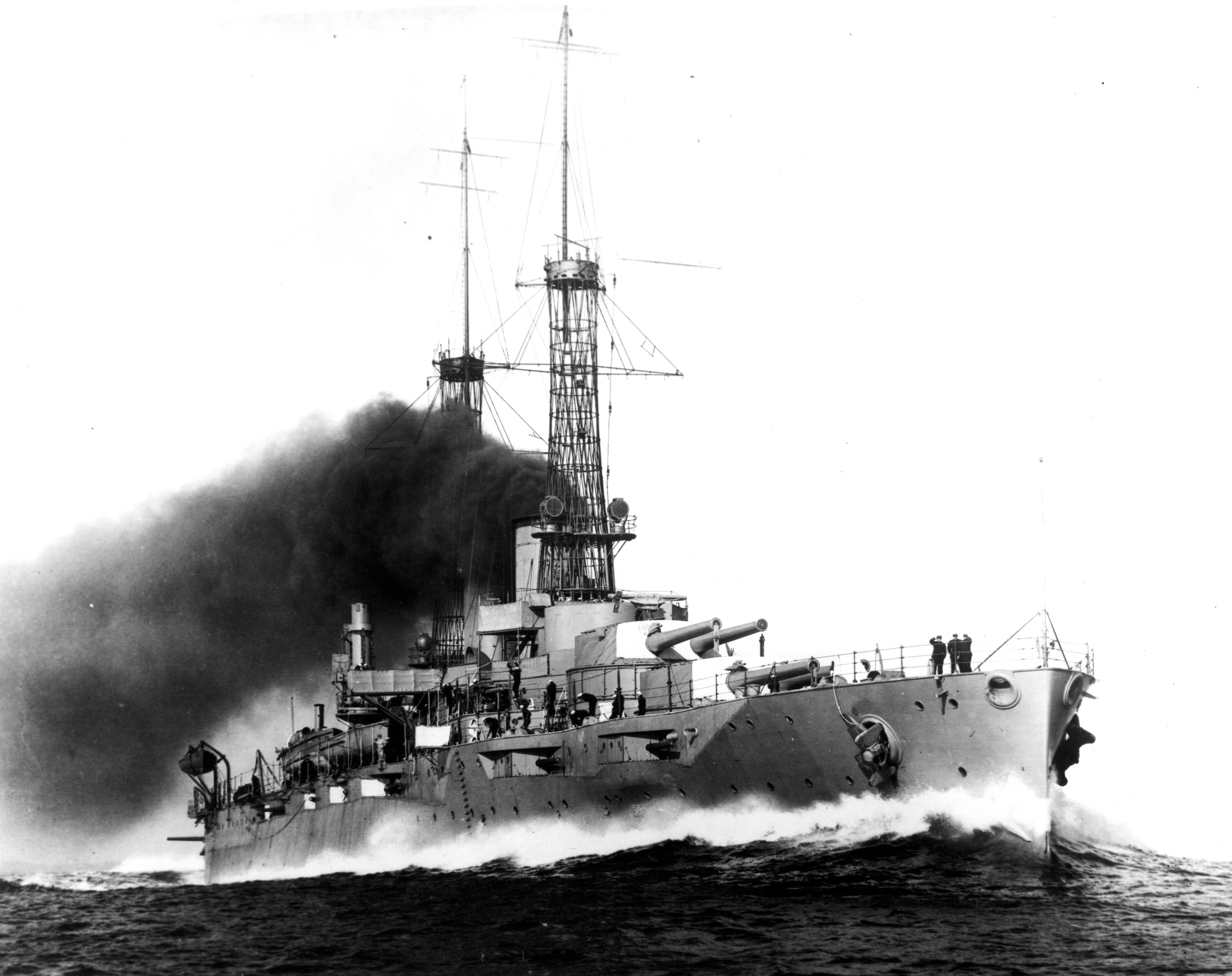
- New York, the lead ship of the class, shortly after entering service in 1915

Class overview
- Name: New York-class battleship
- Builders: Brooklyn Navy Yard; Newport News Shipbuilding Company
- Operators: United States Navy
- Preceded by: Wyoming class
- Succeeded by: Nevada class
- Built: 1911–1914
- In commission: 1914–1946
- Planned: 2
- Completed: 2
- Retired: 2
- Preserved: 1

General characteristics
- Type: Dreadnought battleship
- Displacement: 27,000 long tons (27,433 t) (standard); 28,367 long tons (28,822 t) (full load)
- Length: 573 ft (175 m) (overall); 565 ft (172 m) (waterline)
- Beam: 95 ft 2.5 in (29.020 m)
- Draft: 28 ft 6 in (8.69 m) (mean); 29 ft 7 in (9.02 m) (max)
- Installed power: 14 × water-tube boilers; 28,100 shp (20,954 kW)
- Propulsion: 2 × screw propellers; 2 × triple-expansion steam engines
- Speed: 21 kn (39 km/h; 24 mph)
- Range: 7,060 nmi (13,080 km; 8,120 mi) at 10 kn (19 km/h; 12 mph)
- Complement: 1,042 officers and men
- Sensors & processing systems: 1 × SC radar; 1 × SRa radar; 1 × SK radar
- Armament: 10 × 14 in (356 mm)guns; 21 × 5 in (127 mm) guns; 4 × 3 pdr 47 mm (1.85 in) saluting guns; 2 × 1 pdr 37 mm (1.46 in) guns; 4 × 21 in (533 mm) torpedo tubes
- Armor: Belt: 10–12 in (254–305 mm); casemate: 6.5–11 in (165–279 mm); Barbettes: 10–12 in; Turret face: 14 in (356 mm); Turret side: 2 in (51 mm); Decks: 2 in; Conning tower: 12 in

The New York class was a pair of dreadnought battleships built for the United States Navy between 1911 and 1914. The two ships of the class, New York and Texas, saw extensive service beginning in the occupation of Veracruz, World War I, and World War II.

Designed as a more heavily armed improvement over the previous Wyoming class, the New York class was the first battleship to feature the 14-inch (356 mm)/45 caliber gun and the first American super-dreadnought, but was one of the last battleship classes designed with a five-turret layout and coal for fuel. The class also suffered several deficiencies such as a lack of anti-aircraft weaponry and armor layout, resulting in several extensive overhauls over the course of their careers which greatly changed their appearance. The New York's problems were addressed in the subsequent Standard-type battleships starting with the Nevada class.

Both New York and Texas entered service in 1914 and immediately served in the occupation of Veracruz, and service reinforcing the Royal Navy's Grand Fleet in the North Sea during World War I, during which time New York is believed to have sunk a U-boat in an accidental collision. Both ships undertook numerous training exercises and overhauls during the interwar era, and joined the Neutrality Patrol at the beginning of World War II. Outmoded by more advanced battleships in service, both ships served primarily as convoy escorts and naval artillery during the war. New York supported Operation Torch in North Africa, undertook convoy patrols and training in the Atlantic, and supported the Battle of Iwo Jima and the Battle of Okinawa. Texas supported Operation Torch, Operation Overlord, the bombardment of Cherbourg, Operation Dragoon and the battles at Iwo Jima and Okinawa. Following the war, New York was used as a target ship in Operation Crossroads and sunk as a target in 1948, while Texas was converted into a museum ship, and was moored in San Jacinto State Park until being moved to a drydock in Galveston, Texas in August 2022 for restoration operations.

== Background ==
The New York class was the fifth of 11 separate classes planned by the United States Navy between 1906 and 1919, a total of 29 battleships and 6 battlecruisers. Virtually the entire American battle line was being designed from pre-dreadnought experience and observation of foreign designs. The design of the New York-class battleship originated in the 1908 Newport Conference, which resulted in a new method for battleship design, with the General Board taking a more active role in the design process of ships, and the navy's Board on Construction would implement the design instead of creating it. While the New York class was mostly designed by the Board on Construction, lessons learned on the class allowed the General Board to take the lead on the following Nevada-class battleships.

The Newport Conference established a general consensus among leaders that US Navy ships should carry larger batteries in response to the increasing caliber of battleships in other countries, notably the BL 13.5 inch Mk V naval gun which had been introduced by the Royal Navy's Orion class, as well as the German Navy's shift from 28-centimetre (11 in) to 30.5-centimetre (12 in) guns. There was debate at the time as to whether the Florida-class battleships, laid down in 1909, should carry heavier armament than the 12-inch (305 mm)/45 caliber Mark 5 gun. Ultimately, on 30 March 1909, US Congress approved the construction of two "Design 601" battleships, also known as Battleship 1910 with six 12-inch turrets, which the General Board had selected over two 14-inch designs in 1909. These would become the Wyoming class. At the same time, the General Board began planning for the next class of ships, and on 21 April 1909 decided on two battleships with similar sizes, and after some debate about main guns approval of two battleships was granted on 24 June 1910. In 1911 the US Senate's Naval Affairs Committee suggested reducing the size of the ships as part of a $24,000,000 budget reduction, but Secretary of the Navy George von Lengerke Meyer fought to keep the original design and the ships were not altered.

The class is generally referred to as the New York class, but it is also occasionally called the Texas class because New York was completed several months after her sister, Texas.

== Design ==
=== General characteristics ===
As designed, the ships had a standard displacement of 27,000 long tons (27,433 t) and a full-load displacement of 28,367 long tons (28,822 t). They were 573 ft (175 m) in length overall, 565 ft (172 m) at the waterline, and had a beam of 95 ft 6 in (29.11 m) and a draft of 28 feet 6 inches (8.69 m). The ships underwent significant changes and increases in armor and armament over their operational lives. Following her fourth and final refit in 1943, New York increased her displacement to 29,340 long tons (29,810 t) standard and 34,000 long tons (35,000 t) full-load. The final refit for Texas came in 1945, after which she displaced 29,500 long tons (30,000 t) standard and 32,000 long tons (33,000 t) at full load. As designed, the ships had a crew complement consisting of 1,042 officers and enlisted men. By 1945, Texas was carrying 1,723 officers and enlisted men with the addition of crews for additional weapons as well as a new complement of Marines.

=== Armament ===
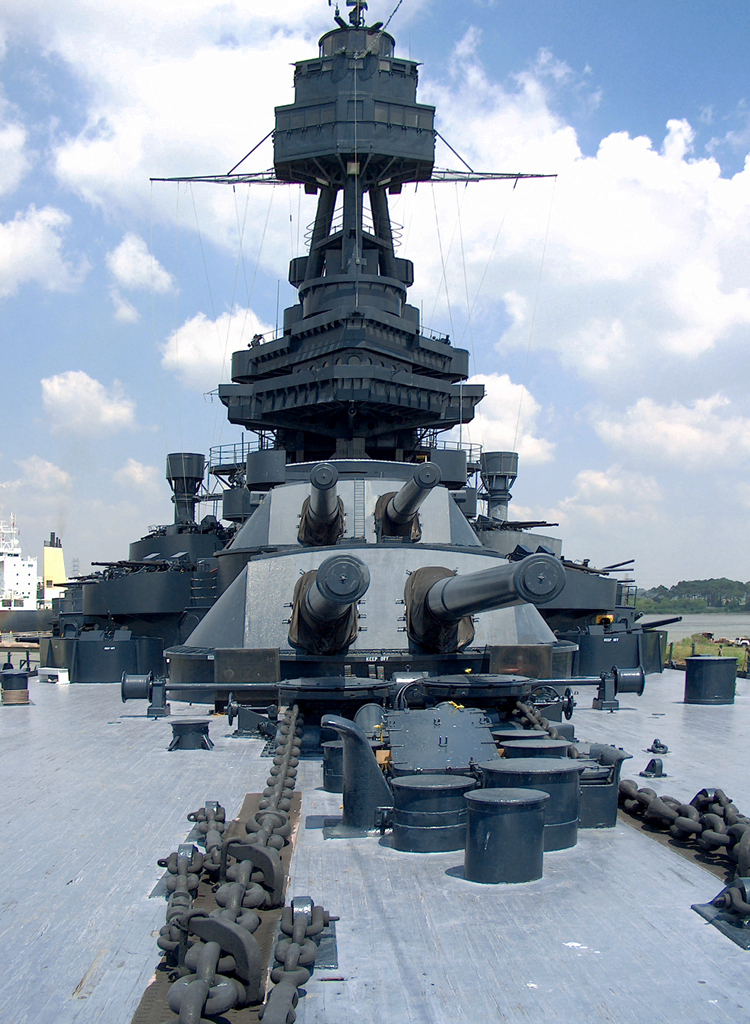
Turrets 1 and 2 aboard Texas, showing the 14-inch guns. The New York class was the first US Navy ship type to carry this heavy gun.

The main battery of the class consisted of ten 14-inch/45 caliber guns, able of elevating to 15 degrees. The guns were arrayed in five 2-gun turrets designated 1, 2, 3, 4, and 5; gun 3 was located amidships, while the other four were arranged in superfiring pairs in the fore and aft. The class was the last to feature a turret mounted amidships. In 1910 the US Navy's Bureau of Ordnance had successfully designed and tested its 14-inch naval gun. The gun proved to have remarkable accuracy and uniformity of pattern. The New York class was the fifth class of US dreadnought battleship design created, and work had already started on the sixth design, the Nevada class. By 1910 no US dreadnought type battleship had yet hit the water, as all were either at some stage of building or in design. Virtually the entire US Navy battle line was being designed by drawing on experience from pre-dreadnought designs or from observation of foreign battleship designs.

As built, both ships also carried 21 5-inch (127 mm)/51 caliber guns arrayed ten to a side with one in the stern, primarily for defense against destroyers and torpedo boats. Many of the 5-inch guns were poor in accuracy in rough seas due to being mounted near the ends of the ship and below the main deck. The ships were not designed with anti-aircraft (AA) defense in mind, and with the development of naval aviation, this was seen as a serious drawback to the class. The New York class was the first US battleship to mount anti-aircraft guns, with two 3-inch (76 mm)/50 caliber guns mounted on platforms on top of the boat cranes of Texas in 1916. In 1918, the secondary armament was reduced to 16 5-inch/51 caliber guns, eight to a side, as the guns near the ends of the ship were difficult to work in any kind of sea. When both ships were refitted 1925–26, AA defense was increased with eight 3-inch/50 caliber guns arrayed four to a side. Six of the sixteen remaining 5-inch guns were relocated higher in the ship to new casemates on the main deck. The New York class also initially featured four torpedo tubes, 1 each on the port side bow and stern and starboard bow and stern, for the Bliss-Leavitt Mark 3 torpedo, instead of the previous two, because of advances in torpedo performance increasing the prominence of the weapon. The torpedo rooms held 12 torpedoes total, plus 12 naval defense mines. However, the torpedo tubes were removed in the 1925-26 refit.

Magazine and machinery spaces were enclosed in the protected hull. Magazine volume was reduced for increased machinery, with each magazine accommodating 75 to 80 shells and charges, while more shells were carried in their turrets and handling rooms.

In 1937 eight 1.1-inch (28 mm)/75 caliber AA guns in two quadruple mounts were added to improve the light AA armament. The ships were more extensively refitted with large amounts of light AA guns at the expense of the 5-inch/51 caliber guns in 1942, as the attack on Pearl Harbor had shown pre-war light AA armament to be inadequate. The 1.1 inch quad mounts were removed and 24 Bofors 40 mm guns were added in six quadruple mounts (later increased to 40 guns), while 44 Oerlikon 20 mm guns in single mounts were also added. New York had an additional two twin mounts of the latter. The 3-inch AA gun armament was increased to 10 guns, while the 5-inch gun armament was reduced to 6 guns.

=== Armor ===
The ships continued the armor suite of the Wyoming class with minor improvements. The deck armor scheme would continue to remain distinctly inferior to the succeeding Nevada class with their all or nothing armor scheme. However the leap forward in range provided by improved fire control was not yet envisioned and had it been there would not have been time to include it within the current design. The ship provided a 12 in (305 mm) belt tapering to 10 in (254 mm) and 6.5 in (165 mm) casemate armor with internal partitioning. The New York class was the first to incorporate an armored central plotting room below decks, but atop the protective deck, and enclosed in a thin box of splinter armor.

Armor on the New York class consisted of belt armor from 10 to 12 inches thick. Their lower casemates had between 9 in (229 mm) and 11 in (279 mm) of armor, and their upper casemate had 6 in (152 mm) of armor. Deck armor was 2 in (51 mm) thick, and turret armor was 14 inches on the face, 4 in (102 mm) on the top, 2 inches on the sides, and 8 in (203 mm) on the rear. Armor on her barbettes was between 10 and 12 inches. Conning towers were protected by 12 inches of armor, with 4 inches of armor on the tops. In all, the armor totaled 261.67 t (257.54 long tons; 288.44 short tons) on the upper casemate, 1,680.33 t (1,653.79 long tons; 1,852.25 short tons) on the lower casemate, 1,549.16 t (1,524.69 long tons; 1,707.66 short tons) along the belt, 127.42 t (125.41 long tons; 140.46 short tons) on the bulkheads, 1,322.11 t (1,301.23 long tons; 1,457.38 short tons) on the splinter deck, 2,085.39 t (2,052.45 long tons; 2,298.75 short tons) on the barbettes, and 856.11 t (842.59 long tons; 943.70 short tons) on the conning tower for a total protection of 8,120.62 t (7,992.37 long tons; 8,951.45 short tons).

=== Propulsion ===
The ships were powered by 14 Babcock & Wilcox coal-fired boilers driving two dual-acting triple expansion reciprocating steam engines, with 28,100 shp (20,954 kW) producing a maximum speed of 21 kn (39 km/h; 24 mph). They had a range of 7,060 nmi (8,120 mi; 13,080 km) at 10 kn (19 km/h; 12 mph). Initially, designs called for a 14 percent increase in power to 32,000 shp (24,000 kW) over the 28,000 shp (21,000 kW) of the preceding class. However, it was discovered that greater propulsive efficiency of the reciprocating engine allowed a reduction in installed power, needing only 28,100 shp to make 21 knots.

The New York class was the final class of US battleship to be powered by coal. The class was designed to carry 2,850 long tons (2,900 t) of coal, the most of any battleship class. In 1910, the succeeding battleships of the Nevada class were designed with fuel oil in mind. Both ships were converted to carry fuel oil in 1926, and had a capacity of 5,200 long tons (5,300 t) of oil. Six new Bureau Express oil-fired boilers replaced the fourteen older design coal-fired boilers at that time with no loss of power.

== Construction ==
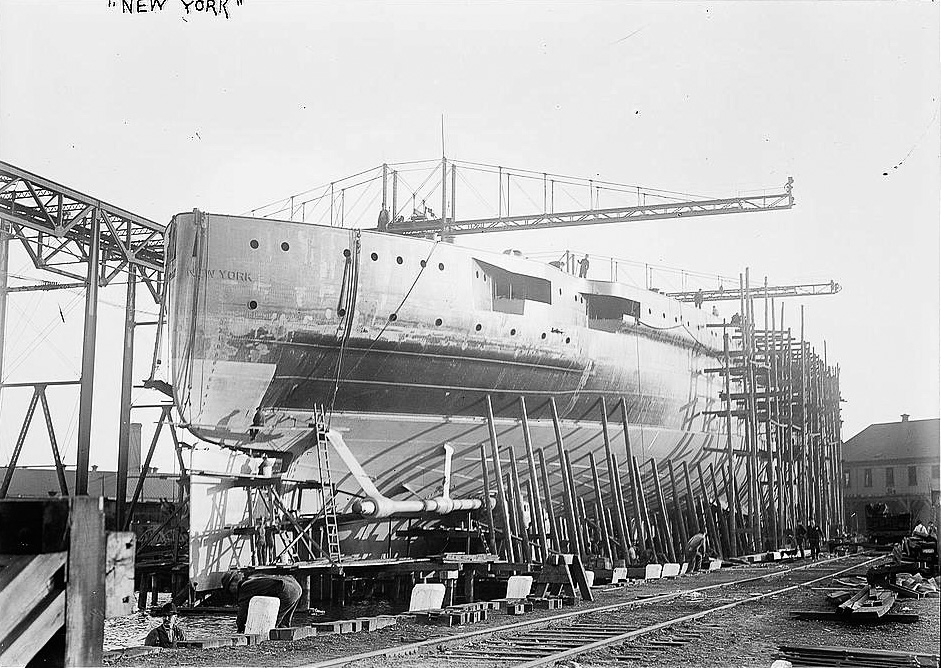
New York under construction in 1912

Funding for the battleships was authorized by a 24 June 1910 act, which called for the ships to cost no more than $6,000,000. The act also specified new labor policies for their construction which put strict limits on labor hours and working conditions for shipyard employees. Bids were solicited only for Battleship No. 35, Texas, on 27 September 1910, while Battleship No. 34, New York, was to be built by New York Navy Yard. Bids opened for No. 35 on 1 December. Ultimately Newport News Shipbuilding Company won the contract with a bid of $5,830,000. Battleship No. 35 began construction first, on 17 April 1911, launched 18 May 1912, and completed on 12 March 1914. Battleship No. 34 was laid down on 11 September 1911, launched on 30 October 1912, and completed on 15 April 1914.

By 1926, the New York class was considered obsolete compared with other battleships in service, so both ships received a complete refit. While several other battleships in service, including Utah and Florida, were converted to training ships or scrapped, New York and Texas were chosen to be overhauled to increase their speed, armor, and armament, in accordance with the Washington Naval Treaty of 1922.

An additional 3,000 long tons (3,000 t) were added for defense against aerial targets and submarines. Her fourteen coal-fired boilers were replaced by six Bureau Express oil-fired boilers and the twin funnels were trunked into one, aft of the forward superstructure. Tripods were fitted in place of the lattice masts, and atop the forward tripod a control tower was installed. A tower was built amidships that contained additional fire control to backup the system on the foremast. A new aircraft catapult was installed atop turret Number 3, and cranes were installed on either side of the funnel for boat and aircraft handling. Additional deck protection was added, and each ship's beam was widened. The ships were fitted with anti-torpedo bulges, though these made maneuvering harder at low speeds and both rolled badly, and gunfire accuracy was reduced in rough seas.

== Service history ==
=== USS New York ===
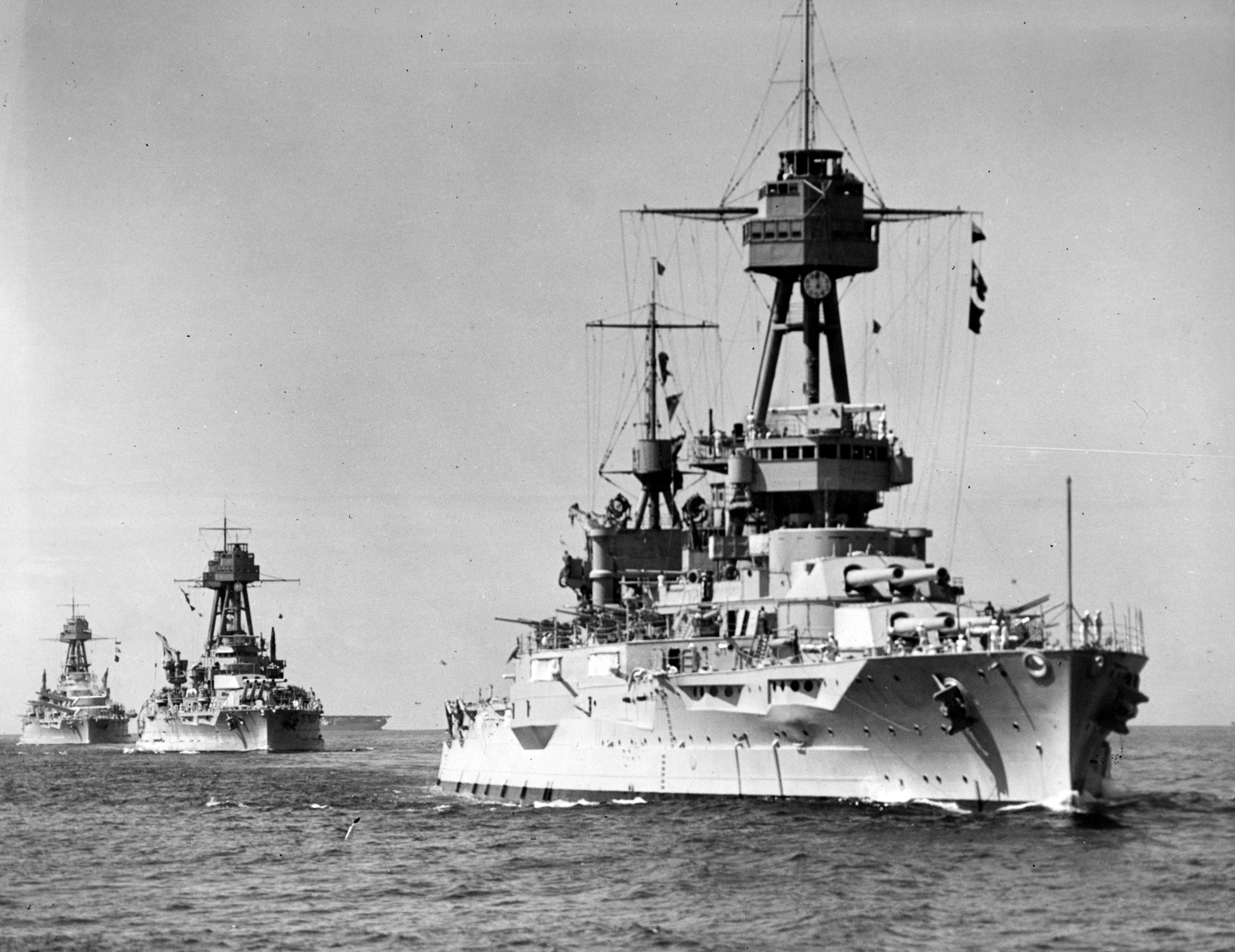
New York (right) during training in 1932

Shortly after commissioning, New York became flagship for the United States occupation of Veracruz in 1914. During World War I, she became flagship of Battleship Division 9, commanded by Rear Admiral Hugh Rodman. Sent to reinforce the British Grand Fleet in the North Sea, she conducted blockade and escort duties. She twice came into contact with German U-boats, and is believed to have accidentally sunk one. She returned to the United States at the end of the war, and began taking on patrol and training duties. New York was fitted with XAF RADAR in February 1938, including the first United States duplexer so a single antenna could both send and receive.

She was a part of the Neutrality Patrol following the outbreak of World War II in September 1939, and spent the beginning of the war escorting convoys between New York and Iceland. She saw action supporting Operation Torch, the Allied invasion of North Africa, where she targeted shore batteries threatening the landings in November 1942. She remained in convoy patrol and training for several years, until she was moved to the Pacific Fleet late in the war and supported landings on Iwo Jima in February 1945, and later the invasion of Okinawa in April 1945. She was lightly damaged by a kamikaze attack in this battle. Following the war, she was used as a target ship during the two atomic bomb tests of Operation Crossroads, and was subsequently studied for its effects, before being sunk as a target off Hawaii in 1948.

=== USS Texas ===
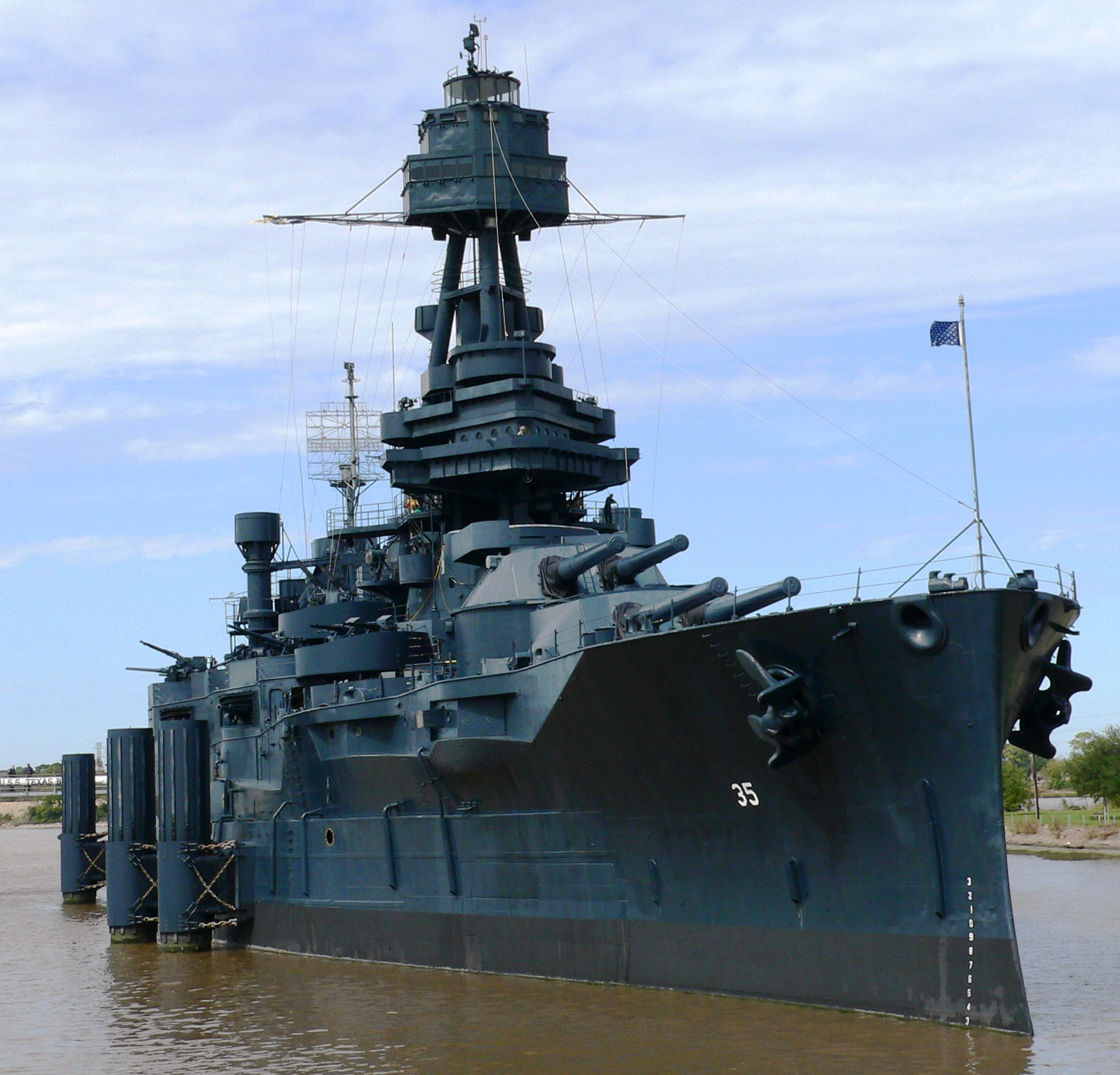
Texas at San Jacinto State Park, where she resided as a museum ship until 2022

Texas also participated in the occupation of Veracruz for several months in 1914, before conducting training and upgrades to become the first ship of the US Navy to mount anti-aircraft weapons. She conducted convoy patrols early in World War I and was the first US ship to fire on a German one during a convoy mission in 1917. She joined other US battleships in reinforcing the British fleet near the end of the war and was present for the German surrender. In the inter-war period she became one of the first battleships to launch and operate aircraft, and frequently alternated her time between the Atlantic and Pacific waters on training exercises.

She was part of the Neutrality Patrol at the beginning of World War II and supported Allied landings at North Africa, and then conducted convoy patrol duty to North African and European ports throughout 1943. On 6 June 1944, she supported Operation Overlord, covering Allied landings on the beaches of Normandy, France, in particular the battle at Pointe du Hoc. Later that month on 25 June, she supported the bombardment of Cherbourg and there was damaged when she was hit with a German artillery shell. In July she moved to support Operation Dragoon, the Allied invasion of southern France. Following extensive repairs and training, she moved to the Pacific and supported the invasion of Iwo Jima in February 1945. She then moved to support landings on Okinawa in April. Following the end of the war, Texas was decommissioned, and in 1948 she was moved to San Jacinto State Park and converted into a museum ship. She remained there until 31 August 2022. She was floated to a drydock in Galveston, Texas for $35,000,000 restoration project estimated to last for 12–18 months. In 2024, it was announced that the ship will stay in Galveston as a museum ship when restoration is completed.

== Ships in class ==
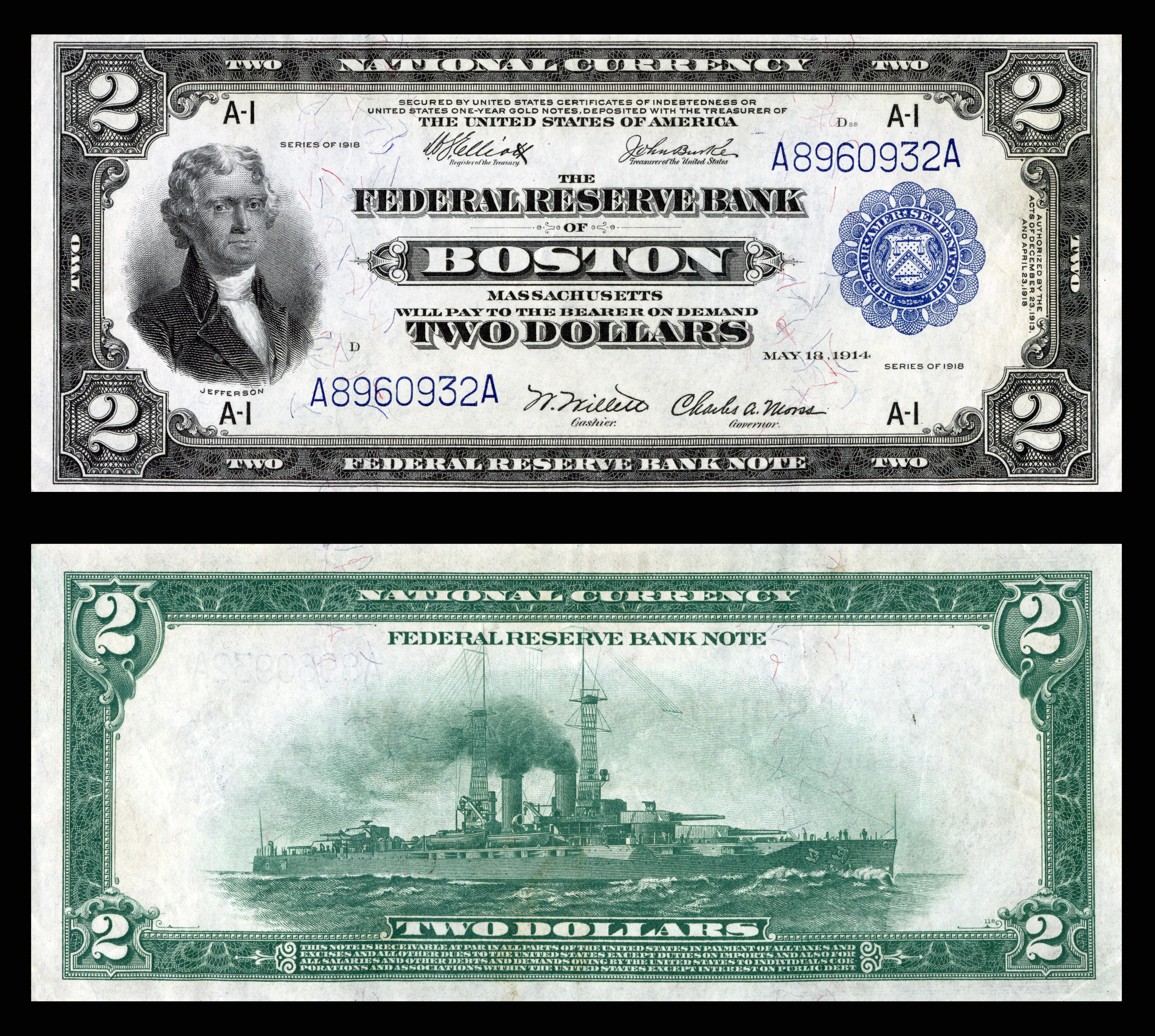
New York-class battleship on the reverse of a 1918 US two dollar bill.

Construction data
Ship name	Hull no.	Builder	Laid down	Launched	Commissioned	Decommissioned	Fate
New York	BB-34	Brooklyn Navy Yard	11 September 1911	30 October 1912	15 May 1914	29 August 1946	Struck 13 July 1948; Sunk as target, 8 July 1948
Texas	BB-35	Newport News Shipbuilding	17 April 1911	18 May 1912	12 March 1914	21 April 1948	Struck 30 April 1948; Museum ship undergoing substantial restoration with limited public viewing, new home to be Galveston Wharves Pier 15
