= CXAM radar =

Radar system

CXAM
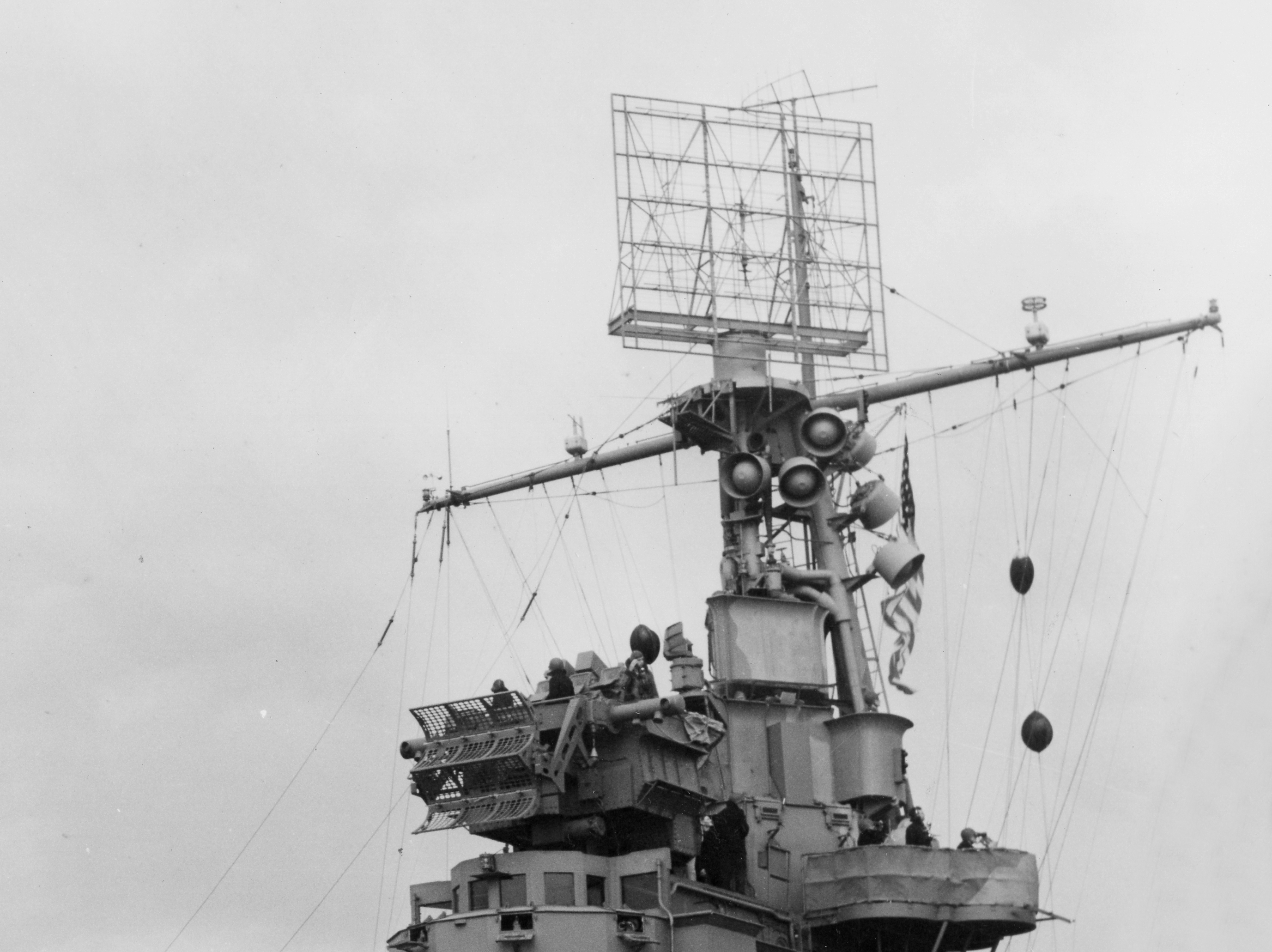
- The CXAM-1 antenna aboard USS Ranger (CV-4) in November 1942
- Country of origin: United States of America
- Manufacturer: RCA
- Designer: NRL
- Introduced: July 1940
- No. built: 6 (CXAM); 14 (CXAM-1)
- Frequency: 200 MHz
- PRF: 1640
- Beamwidth: 14° (horizontal) 70° (vertical)
- Pulsewidth: 3 𝜇s
- RPM: 5 RPM
- Power: 15 kW
- Related: XAF radar

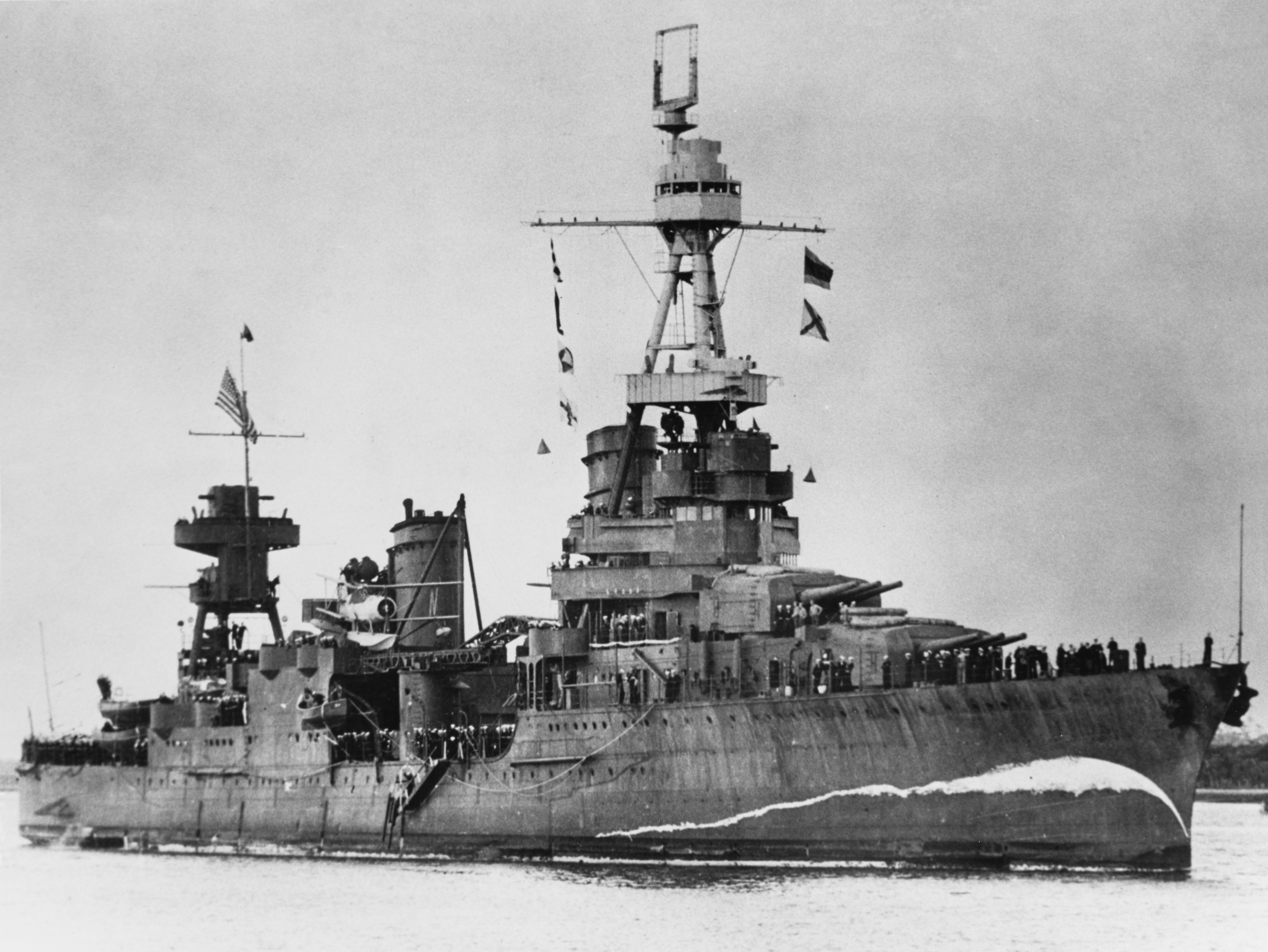
USS Northampton (CA-26) at Brisbane, Australia, on 15 August 1941, carrying an early CXAM radar on her foremast

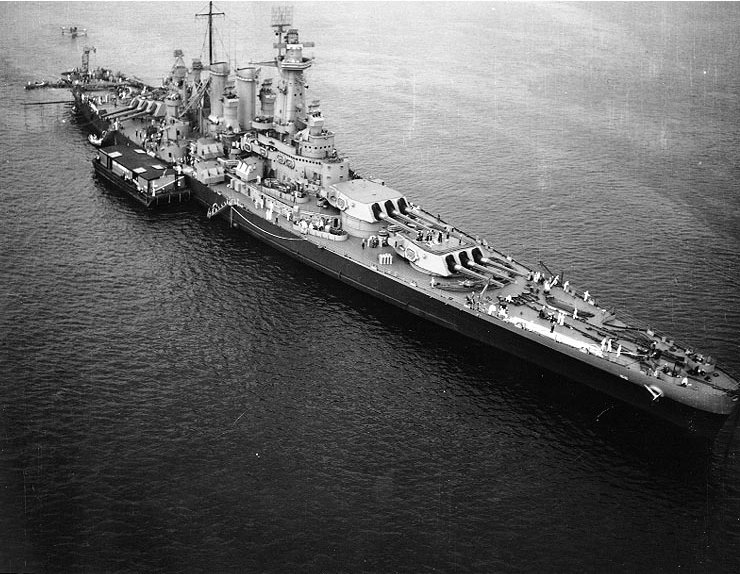
USS Washington (BB-56) off New York City, New York, 21 August 1942, with CXAM-1 antenna visible top center

The CXAM radar system was the first production radar system deployed on United States Navy ships, operating in the mid-high VHF frequency band of 200 MHz. It followed several earlier prototype systems, such as the NRL radar installed in April 1937 on the destroyer Leary; its successor, the XAF, installed in December 1938 on the battleship New York; and the first RCA-designed system, the CXZ, installed in December 1938 or January 1939 on the battleship Texas. Based on testing in January 1939, where the XAF was more reliable, the US Navy ordered RCA to build six XAF-based units for deployment and then shortly thereafter ordered 14 more.

The first six units RCA produced (delivered in 1940) were denoted "CXAM" and were a fusion of XAF and CXZ technologies. These were installed on the battleship California, the aircraft carrier Yorktown (in September 1940), and the heavy cruisers Pensacola, Northampton, Chester, and Chicago. The next 14 units RCA produced (also delivered in 1940) were denoted "CXAM-1" and were slight improvements over the CXAM design. These were installed on the battleships Texas (in October 1941), Pennsylvania, West Virginia, North Carolina, and Washington; on the aircraft carriers Lexington, Saratoga, Ranger, Enterprise, and Wasp; on the heavy cruiser Augusta; on two light cruisers; and on the seaplane tender Curtiss.

Radar detection range of aircraft depends on altitude, size, and number of the target aircraft, as well as the radar's characteristics, such as transmitter power and receiver sensitivity. Surface ships are more difficult to detect due to a number of factors such as signal return from waves (called in general ground clutter), distance to the horizon (due to the curvature of the Earth), elevation of the radar antenna, height of the target above the sea surface, and water vapor in the air. These factors serve to reduce the range at which a surface target can be detected when compared to aircraft. The CXAM is listed (in U.S. Radar, Operational Characteristics of Radar Classified by Tactical Application) as being able to detect single aircraft at 50 miles (80 km) and to detect large ships at 14 miles (23 km). Other sources list CXAM detection range on aircraft out to 100 miles (160 km). Lexington's CXAM-1 detected the incoming Japanese carrier aircraft strike at a range of 68 miles (109 km) during the battle of the Coral Sea.

The US Army's first non-prototype radar system, the SCR-270, was developed in parallel with the CXAM.

== Variants ==
- CXAM First version, six produced and installed July and August 1940.
- CXAM-1 Second version. Non-elevating antennas, servo improvements, and improved accuracy. Delivered starting late 1941 with fourteen units produced.

== Platforms ==
=== CXAM ===
- USS California (BB-44): Installed between July and August 1940, removed after sinking at Pearl Harbor. Unit subsequently installed as Army search set on Oahu and later transferred to USS Hornet (CV-8) in the summer of 1942.
- USS Yorktown (CV-5): Installed between July and August 1940 with initial delivery of CXAM
- USS Pensacola (CA-24): Installed between July and August 1940 with initial delivery of CXAM
- USS Northampton (CA-26): Installed between July and August 1940 with initial delivery of CXAM
- USS Chester (CA-27): Installed between July and August 1940 with initial delivery of CXAM
- USS Chicago (CA-29): Installed between July and August 1940 with initial delivery of CXAM
- USS Hornet (CV-8): Received unit from USS California (BB-44) Summer of 1942.

=== CXAM-1 ===
- North Carolina-class battleships
- Lexington-class aircraft carriers
- Curtiss-class seaplane tenders
- USS Ranger (CV-4)
- USS Enterprise (CV-6)
- USS Wasp (CV-7)
- USS Texas (BB-35)
- USS Pennsylvania (BB-38)
- USS West Virginia (BB-48)
- USS Cincinnati (CL-6)
