= USS Pensacola (CA-24) =

Pensacola-class heavy cruiser

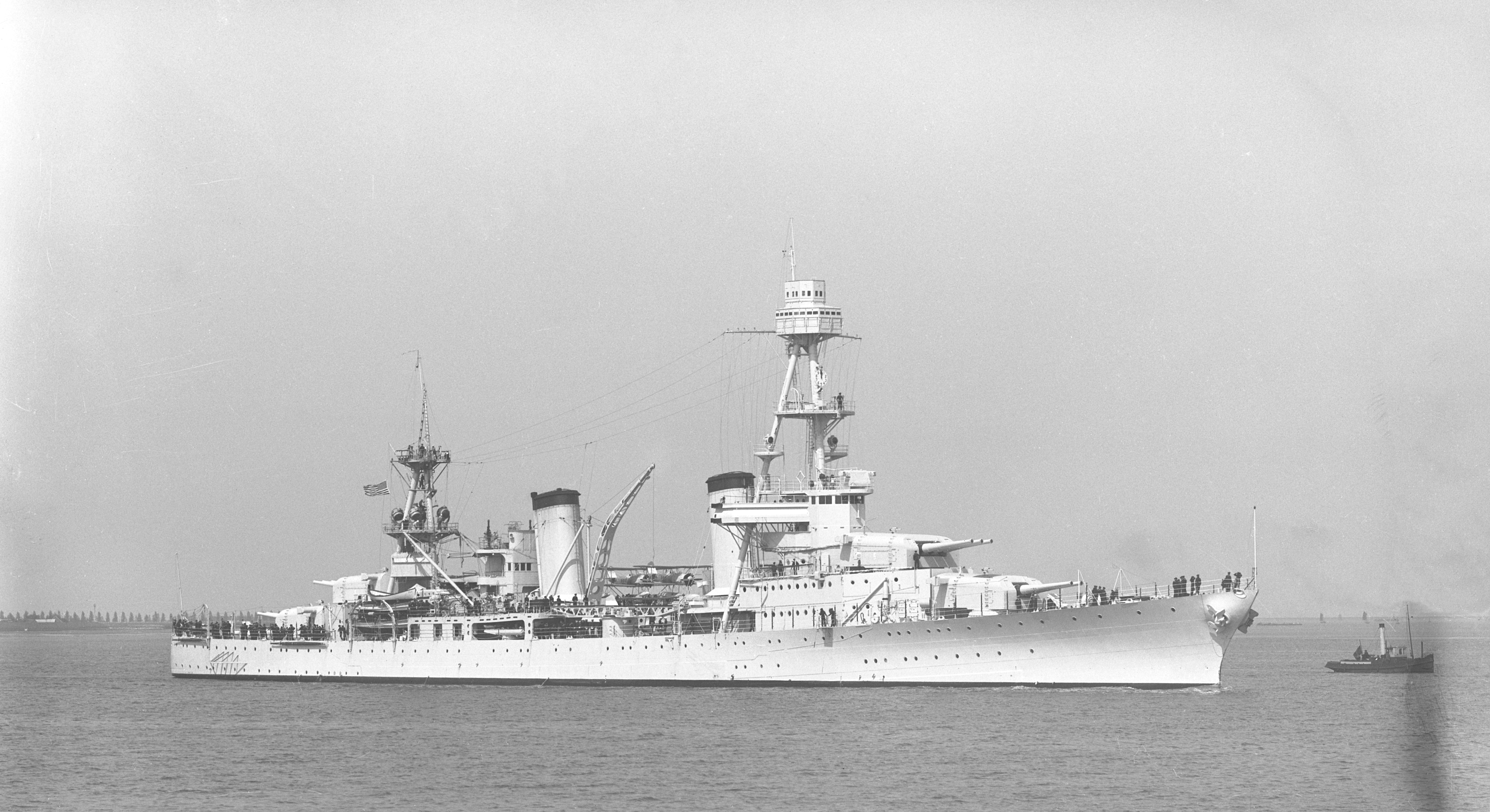
- USS Pensacola (CA-24) in the Scheldt

History

United States
- Name: Pensacola
- Namesake: City of Pensacola, Florida
- Ordered: 18 December 1924
- Awarded: 7 March 1925; 9 July 1926 (supplementary contract)
- Builder: New York Navy Yard, Brooklyn, New York
- Cost: $11,100,000 (limit of cost)
- Laid down: 27 October 1926
- Launched: 25 April 1929
- Sponsored by: Mrs. Joseph L. Seligman
- Completed: 9 July 1929
- Commissioned: 6 February 1930
- Decommissioned: 26 August 1946
- Reclassified: CA-24, 1 July 1931
- Stricken: 28 November 1945
- Identification: Hull symbol: CL-24; Hull symbol: CA-24; Code letters: NIJS
- Nickname(s): "Grey Ghost"
- Honors and awards: 13 × Battle stars
- Fate: Sunk as a target, 10 November 1948
- Notes: Designated as a test ship for Operation Crossroads at Bikini Atoll; Survived atomic aerial burst, 1 July 1946; Survived atomic subsurface burst, 25 July 1946

General characteristics (as built)
- Class & type: Pensacola-class cruiser
- Displacement: 9,100 long tons (9,246 t) (standard)
- Length: 585 ft 6 in (178.46 m) oa; 558 ft (170 m) pp
- Beam: 65 ft 3 in (19.89 m)
- Draft: 16 ft 2 in (4.93 m) (mean); 22 ft (6.7 m) (max)
- Installed power: 12 × White-Forster boilers; 107,000 shp (80,000 kW)
- Propulsion: 4 × Parsons reduction steam turbines; 4 × screws
- Speed: 32.7 kn (37.6 mph; 60.6 km/h)
- Range: 10,000 nmi (12,000 mi; 19,000 km) at 15 kn (17 mph; 28 km/h)
- Capacity: 1,500 short tons (1,400 t) fuel oil
- Complement: 85 officers 445 enlisted
- Sensors & processing systems: CXAM radar from 1940
- Armament: 10 × 8 in (203 mm)/55 caliber guns (2×3, 2×2); 8 × 5 in (127 mm)/25 caliber anti-aircraft guns; 2 × 3-pounder 47 mm (1.9 in) saluting guns; 6 × 21 in (533 mm) torpedo tubes (2×3)
- Armor: Belt: 2 1/2–4 in (64–102 mm); Deck: 1–1 3/4 in (25–44 mm); Barbettes: 3/4 in (19 mm); Turrets: 3/4–2 1/2 in (19–64 mm); Conning Tower: 1 1/4 in (32 mm)
- Aircraft carried: 4 × floatplanes
- Aviation facilities: 2 × Amidship catapults

General characteristics (1942)
- Armament: 10 × 8 in (203 mm)/55 caliber guns (2×3, 2×2); 8 × 5 in (127 mm)/25 caliber anti-aircraft guns; 2 × 3-pounder 47 mm (1.9 in) saluting guns; 4 × 1.1 in (27.9 mm)/75 anti-aircraft guns; 8 × single 20 mm (0.79 in) Oerlikon cannons

General characteristics (1945)
- Armament: 10 × 8 in (203 mm)/55 caliber guns (2×3, 2×2); 8 × 5 in (127 mm)/25 caliber anti-aircraft guns; 7 × quad 40 mm (1.6 in) Bofors guns; 9 × twin 20 mm (0.79 in) Oerlikon cannons

USS Pensacola (CL/CA-24) was a cruiser of the United States Navy that was in service from 1929 to 1945. She was the lead ship of the Pensacola class, which the Navy classified as light cruisers in 1929, with the Pensacola herself originally designated as "CL-24." Under the terms of the Washington Naval Treaty, from 1931 on the class was re-classified as heavy cruisers, with the Pensacola being re-designated as "CA-24." The third Navy ship to be named after the city of Pensacola, Florida, she was nicknamed the "Grey Ghost" by Tokyo Rose. She received 13 battle stars for her service.

She was laid down by the New York Navy Yard on 27 October 1926, launched on 25 April 1929, sponsored by Mrs. Joseph L. Seligman, and commissioned on 6 February 1930.

== Service history ==
=== Inter-war period ===
Pensacola departed New York on 24 March 1930, and transited the Panama Canal to Callao, Peru, and Valparaíso, Chile, before returning to New York on 5 June. For the next four years she operated along the eastern seaboard and in the Caribbean Sea, several times transiting the Panama Canal for combined Fleet battle practice ranging from California to Hawaii.

Originally CL-24, effective 1 July 1931, Pensacola was redesignated CA-24 in accordance with the provisions of the London Naval Treaty of 1930.

Pensacola departed Norfolk on 15 January 1935, to join the Pacific Fleet arriving San Diego, her new home port, on 30 January. Fleet problems ranged to Hawaii, one cruise took her to Alaska, and combined fleet maneuvers returned her briefly to the Caribbean Sea before she sailed on 5 October 1939 to base at Pearl Harbor, arriving on the 12th. Pensacola was one of six ships to receive the new RCA CXAM radar in 1940. Maneuvers frequently found the cruiser off Midway and French Frigate Shoals, and she made one voyage to Guam.

=== World War II ===
==== 1941–1942 ====
Pensacola departed Pearl Harbor on 29 November 1941, with the so-called "Pensacola Convoy", bound for Manila, in the Philippines. After the attack on Pearl Harbor, the convoy was diverted to Australia, entering Brisbane harbor on 22 December. Pensacola returned to Pearl Harbor on 19 January 1942, and put to sea on 5 February to patrol the approaches to the Samoan Islands. On 17 February 1942, she rendezvoused off Samoa with Carrier Task Force 11 (TF 11), built around Lexington.

Near Bougainville Island, Pensacola's gunners helped repel two waves of Japanese bombers on 20 February. No ships were damaged. Anti-aircraft fire and Lexington Combat Air Patrol planes shot down 17 of the 18 attackers.

Pensacola continued to help guard Lexington on offensive patrol in the Coral Sea until Yorktown joined the task force on 6 March. The American ships steamed for the Gulf of Papua where—on 10 March—Lexington launched planes for a surprise strike over the Owen Stanley Mountains at Japanese shipping and installations at Salamaua and Lae. A complete surprise, the raid caused heavy damage. The task force then turned toward Nouméa, New Caledonia, to replenish. Pensacola patrolled with Yorktown's task force until 8 April, then headed, via Samoa, for Pearl Harbor, arriving on 21 April. She carried Marine Fighting Squadron 212 (VMF-212) to Efate in the New Hebrides Islands and returned to Pearl Harbor with Enterprise on 26 May.

Pensacola departed Pearl Harbor on 28 May with the Enterprise task force for a rendezvous on 2 June northeast of Midway with units of TF 17. Two days later, when the Japanese armada came within range of the American carriers, the battle of Midway commenced.

Admiral Spruance's torpedo planes and dive-bombers attacked the Japanese carriers. Akagi and Kaga went up in flames, and Sōryū was badly damaged. A fourth enemy carrier—Hiryū, still at large—launched strikes at Yorktown and the American flattops struck back, leaving the enemy carrier hit many times, in a mass of flames. Meanwhile, Yorktown—hit by three bombs—was fighting for her life. Pensacola raced from Enterprise′s screen to aid the stricken carrier. While trying to assist Yorktown, the ship was struck with a torpedo and hit in the galley. Yorktown was dead in the water when Pensacola arrived, and the cruiser assisted in shooting down four enemy torpedo bombers during a second attack.

Despite all that could be done, Yorktown received two torpedo hits amidships and had to be abandoned. Pensacola rejoined the screen of Enterprise to pursue the retiring Japanese.

Pensacola returned to Pearl Harbor on 13 June and—with Enterprise—again put to sea on 22 June, carrying 1,157 marines of Marine Aircraft Group 22 (MAG 22) to Midway. She patrolled and trained in Hawaiian waters until 7 August. As Marines stormed the shores of Guadalcanal, the cruiser set course for the Solomons in the screen of Saratoga, Hornet and Wasp to support the leathernecks in that bitter campaign. In submarine-infested waters, torpedoes damaged Saratoga on 31 August and sank Wasp on 15 September.

Pensacola arrived at Nouméa, New Caledonia on 26 September, and departed with Hornet on 2 October to strike the enemy in the Santa Isabel–Guadalcanal area. On 24 October, Hornet′s task group joined Enterprise and the combined force steamed to intercept enemy warships approaching the Guadalcanal-Tulagi area.

On 26 October, search planes located a Japanese carrier and battleship formation, beginning the Battle of the Santa Cruz Islands which was fought without contact being made between surface ships of the opposing forces. Air strikes inflicted severe bomb damage to Zuihō and Shōkaku, and sank Yura. Bomb hits damaged Kirishima and other enemy ships.

Pensacola helped fight off a coordinated dive bombing and torpedo plane raid which damaged Hornet so severely that she had to be abandoned. Within minutes of the attack on Hornet, 24 dive bombers dropped 23 bombs in a run on Enterprise. Despite damage, the famed "Fighting Lady" launched a large number of planes from Hornet besides her own.

Pensacola received 188 survivors from Hornet, whom she debarked at Nouméa on 30 October 1942. The task force had turned back a Japanese attempt to regain Guadalcanal, sunk Yura, and damaged a number of enemy capital ships. Japanese carriers lost 123 planes.

Pensacola departed Nouméa on 2 November to guard transports landing Marine reinforcements, and supplies, at Aola Bay, Guadalcanal. She helped guard Enterprise during the Naval Battle of Guadalcanal on 12–13 November. Planes from Enterprise assisted in the sinking of Hiei, one cruiser, three destroyers, and eleven auxiliaries, and the damaging of four cruisers and four destroyers.

===== Battle of Tassafaronga =====
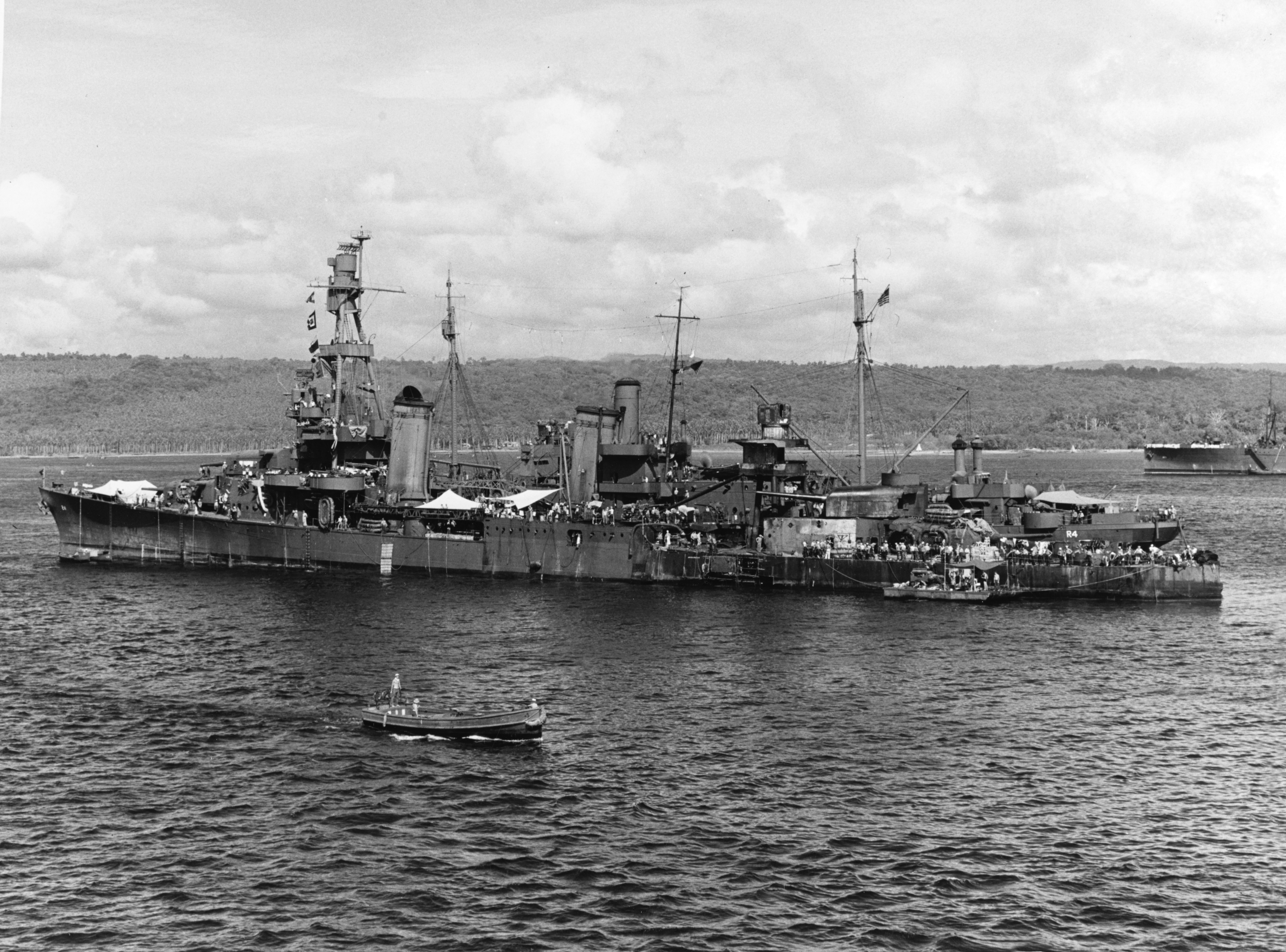
Pensacola the day after being heavily damaged off Tassafaronga by a Japanese torpedo.

Pensacola returned to Espiritu Santo to join TF 67 under Rear Admiral Carleton H. Wright. On 29 November, TF 67 sailed to intercept a Japanese destroyer-transport force expected off Guadalcanal the next night. Just before midnight of the 30th, the American ships transited Lengo Channel and headed past Henderson Field on Guadalcanal as the Japanese task group steamed on a southerly course west of Savo Island to enter "Ironbottom Sound".

The two opposing task forces clashed in the Battle of Tassafaronga. American destroyers launched torpedoes as the enemy range came within 5 mi (4.3 nmi; 8.0 km) of Pensacola′s cruiser formation. Now gun flashes, tracers, and star shell candles stained the inky darkness. Takanami—hit many times—was afire and exploding. Minneapolis took two torpedo hits that blasted her bow downward like an immense scoop and left her forecastle deck awash, but she continued to fight on. New Orleans closed on Minneapolis, and ran into the track of a torpedo that ripped off the forward part of the warship.

Pensacola turned left to prevent collision with two damaged American ships ahead of her. Silhouetted by the burning American cruisers, she came into the Japanese line of fire. One of 18 torpedoes launched by Japanese destroyers hit her below the mainmast on the portside. Her engine room flooded, three gun turrets went out of commission, and her oil tanks ruptured to make a soaked torch of her mast. Meantime, Honolulu maneuvered radically at 30 kn (35 mph; 56 km/h), her guns continuing their rapid fire as she escaped the trap. The last American cruiser in column—Northampton—took two torpedo hits to duplicate on a larger scale the havoc inflicted on Pensacola.

The oil-fed flames engulfed Pensacola's main deck aft where ammunition exploded. Only supreme effort and skillful damage control by her men saved the ship. The fire—punctuated by the frightful explosion of 8-inch projectiles in her Number 3 turret—gradually subsided. Pensacola made steady progress toward Tulagi. She arrived there still aflame. After 12 hours the last fire was quenched. Her dead numbered seven officers and 118 men. One officer and 67 men were injured.

==== 1943–1945 ====
Camouflaged as part of the island, Pensacola made repairs in Tulagi Harbor that enabled her to steam to Espiritu Santo, New Hebrides Island. She arrived there on 6 December for emergency repairs by Vestal until she sailed on 7 January 1943 via Samoa to Pearl Harbor, arriving on 27 January.

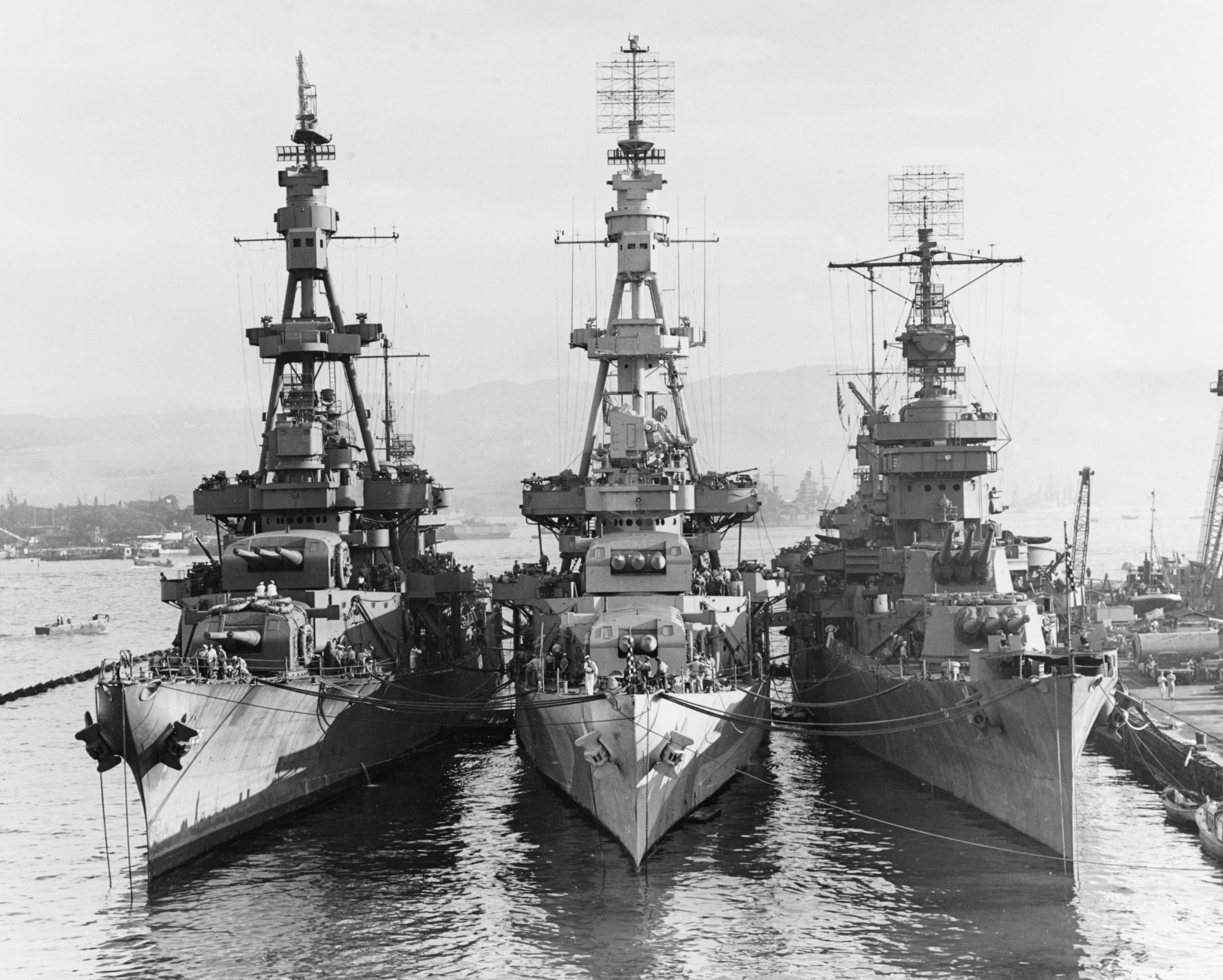
Sister ships Salt Lake City and Pensacola, with New Orleans (L to R), at Pearl Harbor in 1943

On 8 November, Pensacola sailed from Pearl Harbor in the screen of Southern Attack Force aircraft carriers. On 19 November, Pensacola made bombardment runs on Betio and Tarawa. She rained 600 projectiles to put coast defense guns out of action, and destroyed enemy beach defenses and numerous buildings. As troops stormed ashore on Tarawa on 20 November, the cruiser screened carriers launching air strikes supporting the landings. That night, she fought off Japanese torpedo bombers and assisted Independence into Funafuti, Ellice Islands. For the next two months, she ranged out of that base to screen carriers covering the movement of reinforcements and supplies to the Gilberts. On 29 January 1944, she began strikes and bombardments to destroy Japanese air power and shipping in the Marshall Islands. That night, Pensacola helped bombard Taroa in the Eastern Marshalls. She then slammed shells into airfield runways, seaplane ramps, ammunition storage areas and buildings on Wotje. She continued pounding these targets as Marines and Army troops landed on 31 January to seize Kwajalein and Majuro Atolls. The invasion of the Marshall Islands continued on 1 February as Marines occupied Roi and Namur Islands. Pensacola continued to hit hard at Taroa, Maloelap Atoll through 18 February, destroying coastal defenses and air bases of the enemy in the eastern Marshalls. Operating from Majuro and Kwajalein, she continued to patrol in approaches of the Marshalls. She again served in the screen of fast carriers conducting raids in the Caroline Islands (30 March–1 April), against Japanese defenses at Palau, Yap, Ulithi and Woleai.

Pensacola departed Majuro on 25 April sailing via Pearl Harbor and Mare Island for duty in the Northern Pacific, arriving in Kulak Bay on 27 May. On 13 June, she joined her cruiser-destroyer task force in raining destruction on the airfields of Matsuwa, Kuriles. In the early morning of 26 June, she fired 300 8-inch projectiles to destroy shipping, airfields and installations at Kurabu Zaki, Paramushiru To, Kuriles, returning to Kulak Bay on 28 June. Pensacola continued patrol in Alaskan waters until departing Kulak Bay on 8 August for Hawaii.

Pensacola arrived Pearl Harbor on 13 August and put to sea on the 29th. En route to the Marianas on 3 September, she joined an air-sea bombardment of Wake Island. On 9 October, she pounded the main radio station and installations on Marcus Island. She and her sister cruisers and destroyers stirred up a fire melee in their "impersonation" of Halsey's 3rd Fleet to lead the Japanese into thinking the ladder of islands to the Bonins was next on the American timetable for invasion. Meanwhile, Adm. Halsey's units advanced on the Philippines while Fast Carriers rained destruction on the enemy air and Fleet bases at Okinawa and Formosa.

Pensacola made rendezvous with the units of the Fast Carrier Task Force retiring from the great air battles over Formosa. After escorting Canberra and Houston to Ulithi, she joined a Fast Carrier Task Group—including Wasp—on 16 October. The following day, troops supported by the 7th Fleet began the liberation of the Philippine Islands.

Pensacola screened fast aircraft carriers striking Luzon and directly supported the invasion of Leyte beginning on 20 October. She raced north to aid in the destruction of the enemy carrier force in the battle off Cape Engaño on 25 October, then turned south as the fast carriers launched planes to aid the gallant escort carriers.

Pensacola bombarded Iwo Jima on the night of 11/12 November and returned to Ulithi the 14th. As she was about to depart for Saipan on 20 November, she spotted a periscope about 1,200 yd (1,100 m) to starboard. As she maneuvered clear, Case rammed the enemy. Four minutes later, her men witnessed the flaming explosion that destroyed Mississinewa, victim of a Japanese kaiten midget submarine.

Pensacola arrived at Saipan on 22 November to prepare for the invasion of Iwo Jima. Five nights later, she helped splash several attacking Japanese aircraft. She departed Saipan on 6 December, plastering Iwo Jima with 500 8-inch projectiles on the 8th. She returned to Iwo Jima on the 24th and 27th, pounding mountain gun positions north of Suribachi Mountain. She hit defenses on Chichi Jima and Haha Jima as well as Iwo Jima on 5 January and 24 January 1945.

At Ulithi on 27 January, Pensacola formed with a battleship-cruiser-destroyer gunstrike task force under Rear Admiral B. J. Rodgers. Six battleships, four cruisers and a destroyer screen comprised the bombardment force which sailed on 10 February via Tinian to Iwo Jima.

On 16 February, Pensacola opened fire on the northwest sector of Iwo Jima to prepare for the landings. That afternoon, Lieutenant Douglas W. Gandy, USNR—piloting one of Pensacola's OS2U Kingfisher floatplanes—shot down a Japanese fighter. The next morning, Pensacola took six hits from enemy shore batteries as her guns covered operations of the minesweepers close inshore. Three of her officers and 14 men were killed. Another five officers and 114 men were injured.

Pensacola fired back as she retired for temporary repairs then returned to her bombardment station. The morning of 19 February she commenced harassing and counter-battery fire in direct support of the invasion landings. Her deadly guns fought day and night into 1 March when she silenced enemy shore batteries which had hit Terry amidships. After helping Terry′s wounded, she resumed direct bombardment support to advancing Marines that continued into 3 March.

She arrived in Ulithi on 5 March, and was assigned to Task Force 54 (TF 54). They put to sea on the 20th to support the invasion Okinawa, the "last stepping stone" to Japan.

On 25 March, Pensacola bombarded enemy defenses and covered the operations of minesweepers preparing the way for the Okinawa invasion landings. On 27 March, she spotted a torpedo wake on her port quarter. A second "fish" streaked toward the ship from dead astern. As her 40 mm gunners opened fire on the torpedoes, Pensacola went hard left then hard right to parallel the deadly incoming. The first torpedo missed her starboard quarter by less than 20 ft (6.1 m). The second passed some 20 yd (18 m) along the port side of the cruiser as her gunners opened fire with automatic weapons on a submarine periscope.

Pensacola gave direct bombardment support to the initial invasion of Okinawa on 1 April and continued to blast at enemy targets until the 15th. She then sailed via Guam and Pearl Harbor for home. She arrived at Mare Island on 7 May for overhaul.

She sailed on 3 August for Adak, Alaska, and was there when hostilities ended. On the 31st, she sailed with units of Cruiser Division Five en route to Ominato, Northern Honshū, Japan. She anchored in the outer harbor of Ominato on 8 September.

=== Post-war ===
Pensacola departed Ominato on 14 November to embark 200 veterans at Iwo Jima, then touched Pearl Harbor en route to San Francisco, California, arriving on 3 December. Five days later, she put to sea for Apra Harbor, Guam, where she embarked nearly 700 veterans for transport to San Diego, arriving on 9 January 1946.

==== Operation Crossroads ====
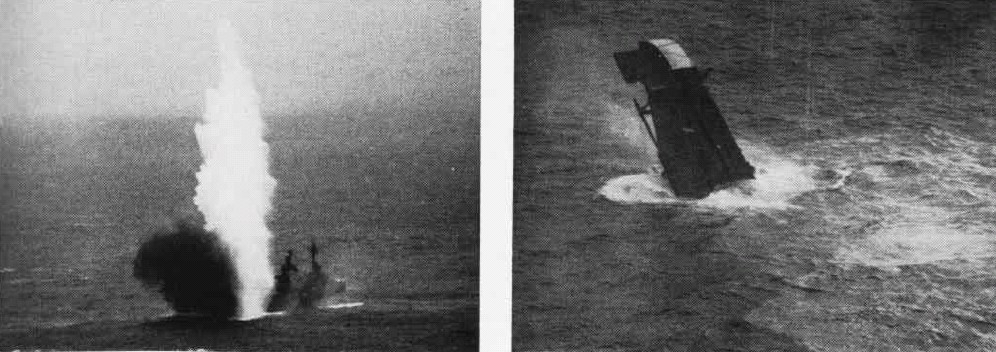
Pensacola being sunk as a target ship in 1948

Pensacola departed San Pedro on 29 April to stage with units of Joint Task Force One at Pearl Harbor in preparation for Operation Crossroads, the atomic bomb experiments at Bikini Atoll. She stood out of Pearl Harbor on 20 May, and reached Bikini on the 29th to serve as a target ship. She survived the tests of 1 July and 25 July. On 24 August, she was taken in tow for Kwajalein where she was decommissioned on 26 August. Her hulk was turned over to the custody of Joint Task Force One for radiological and structural studies. On completion of these studies, her hulk was sunk on 10 November 1948 off the Washington coast. Her wreck has never been found.

== Awards ==
Pensacola received 13 battle stars for World War II service including:

- Midway
- Santa Cruz
- Guadalcanal
- Tassafaronga
- Tarawa
- Makin
- Kwajalein
- Iwo Jima
- Okinawa

== Bibliography ==
- Fahey, James C. (1941). The Ships and Aircraft of the U.S. Fleet, Two-Ocean Fleet Edition. Ships and Aircraft.
- Silverstone, Paul H (1965). US Warships of World War II. Annapolis, Maryland: Naval Institute Press. ISBN 0-87021-773-9.
- Wright, Christopher C. (September 2019). "Question 7/56: Concerning What Radar Systems Were Installed on U.S. Asiatic Fleet Ships in December 1941". Warship International. LVI (3): 192–198. ISSN 0043-0374.
