= USS New York (BB-34) =

Dreadnought battleship of the United States Navy

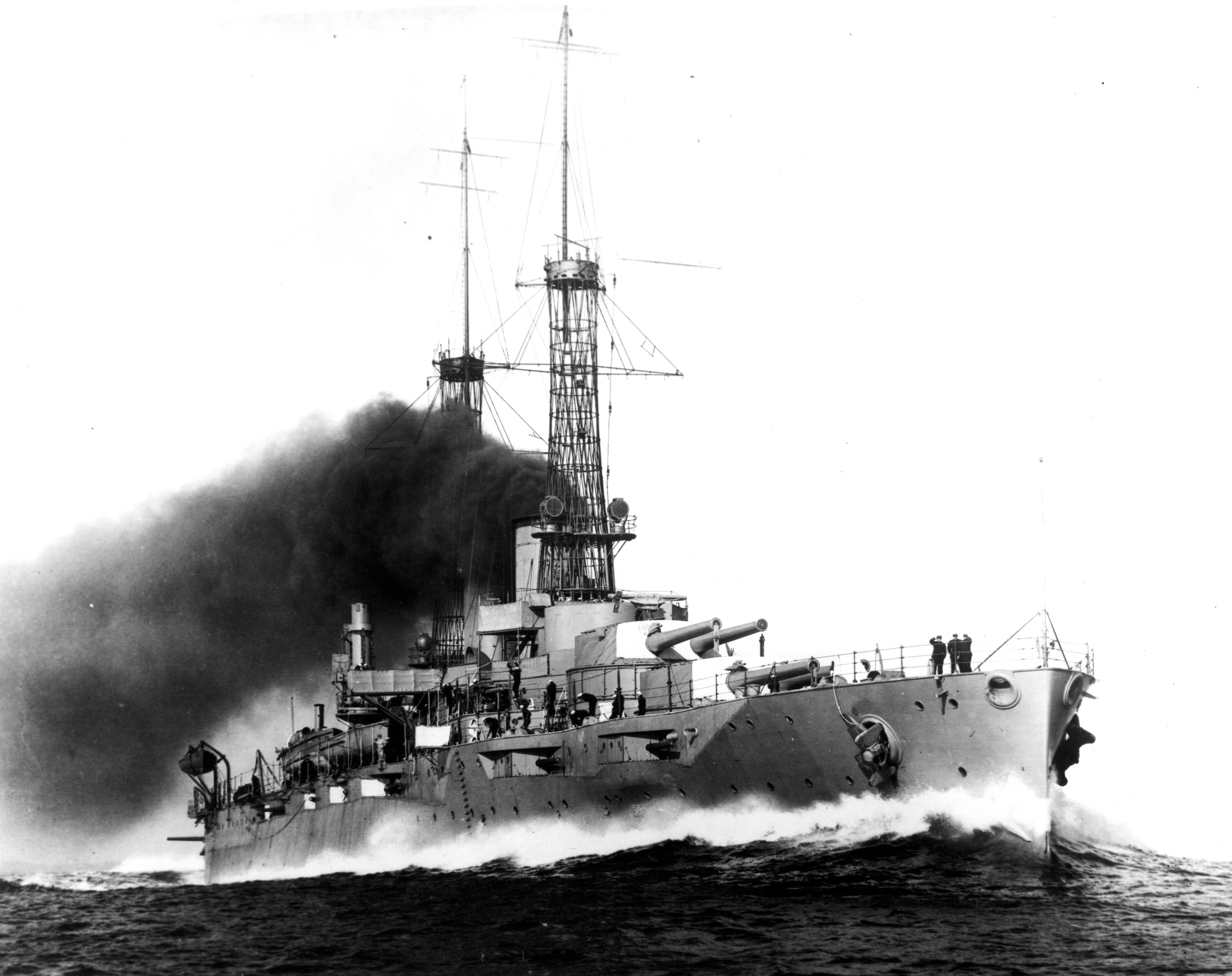
- New York shortly after entering service in 1915

History

United States
- Name: New York
- Namesake: State of New York
- Awarded: 1 May 1911
- Builder: Brooklyn Navy Yard
- Laid down: 11 September 1911
- Launched: 30 October 1912
- Commissioned: 15 May 1914
- Decommissioned: 29 August 1946
- Stricken: 13 July 1948
- Identification: Hull symbol: BB-34
- Honors and awards: 3 × battle star (WW II)
- Fate: Sunk as a target ship, 6 July 1948

General characteristics
- Class & type: New York-class battleship
- Displacement: 27,000 long tons (27,433 t) (standard); 28,367 long tons (28,822 t) (full load)
- Length: 573 ft (174.7 m) (o/a); 565 ft (172.2 m) (waterline)
- Beam: 95 ft 2.5 in (29 m)
- Draft: 28 ft 6 in (8.7 m) (mean); 29 ft 7 in (9 m) (max)
- Installed power: 14 × Babcock & Wilcox boilers; 28,100 shp (20,954 kW)
- Propulsion: 2 × triple-expansion steam engines; 2 × screws
- Speed: 21 knots (39 km/h; 24 mph)
- Range: 7,060 nmi (13,075 km; 8,125 mi) at 10 knots (19 km/h; 12 mph)
- Complement: 1,042 officers and men
- Armament: 5 × twin 14 in (356 mm) guns; 21 × single 5 in (127 mm) guns; 4 × single 3-pounder 47 mm (1.85 in) saluting guns; 2 × single 1-pounder 37 mm (1.46 in) guns; 4 × 21 in (533 mm) torpedo tubes
- Armor: Belt: 10–12 in (254–305 mm); Lower casemate: 9–11 in (229–279 mm); Upper casemate: 6.5 in (165 mm); Barbettes: 10–12 in; Turret face: 14 in (356 mm); Turret top: 4 in (102 mm); Turret side: 2 in (51 mm); Decks: 2 in; Conning tower: 12 in, 4 in (top)

General characteristics (1925–1926 refit)
- Displacement: 27,000 long tons (27,433 t) (standard); 32,000 long tons (32,514 t) (full load)
- Draft: 31 ft 6 in (9.60 m) (max)
- Installed power: 6 × Bureau Express water-tube boilers
- Armament: 5 × twin 14 in (356 mm) guns; 16 × single 5 (127 mm) in guns; 8 × single 3 in (76 mm) AA guns
- Aircraft carried: 3 × floatplanes
- Aviation facilities: 1 × catapult

General characteristics (1942 refit)
- Armament: 5 × twin 14 in (356 mm) guns; 6 × single 5 (127 mm) in guns; 10 × single 3 (76 mm) in AA guns; 6 × quadruple 40 mm (1.6 in) Bofors AA guns; 42 × single 20 mm (0.8 in) Oerlikon AA guns

USS New York (BB-34) was a United States Navy battleship, the lead ship of her class. Named for New York State, she was designed as the first ship to carry the 14-inch (356 mm)/45-caliber gun.

Entering service in 1914, she was part of the U.S. Navy force which was sent to reinforce the British Grand Fleet in the North Sea near the end of World War I. During that time, she was involved in at least two incidents with German U-boats, and is believed to have been the only US ship to have sunk one in the war, during an accidental collision in October 1918. Following the war, she was sent on a series of training exercises and cruises in both the Atlantic and the Pacific, and saw several overhauls to increase her armament, aircraft handling and armor.

She entered the Neutrality Patrol at the beginning of World War II, and served as a convoy escort for ships to Iceland and Great Britain in the early phase of the war. She saw her first combat against coastal artillery during Operation Torch around Casablanca in North Africa, and later became a training ship. Late in the war, she moved to the Pacific, and provided naval gunfire support for the invasion of Iwo Jima and later the invasion of Okinawa. Returning to Pearl Harbor for repairs until the end of the war, she was classified obsolete and was chosen to take part in the Operation Crossroads nuclear weapon tests at Bikini Atoll in 1946. She survived both explosions, and the effects of radiation on the ship were studied for two years. She was eventually sunk as a target in 1948. She received three battle stars for her service.

== Design and construction ==
New York was the first of two planned New York-class battleships, though construction on her began after her sister, Texas. She was ordered in fiscal year 1911 as the first class of battleship in the United States Navy to carry the 14-inch/45-caliber gun.

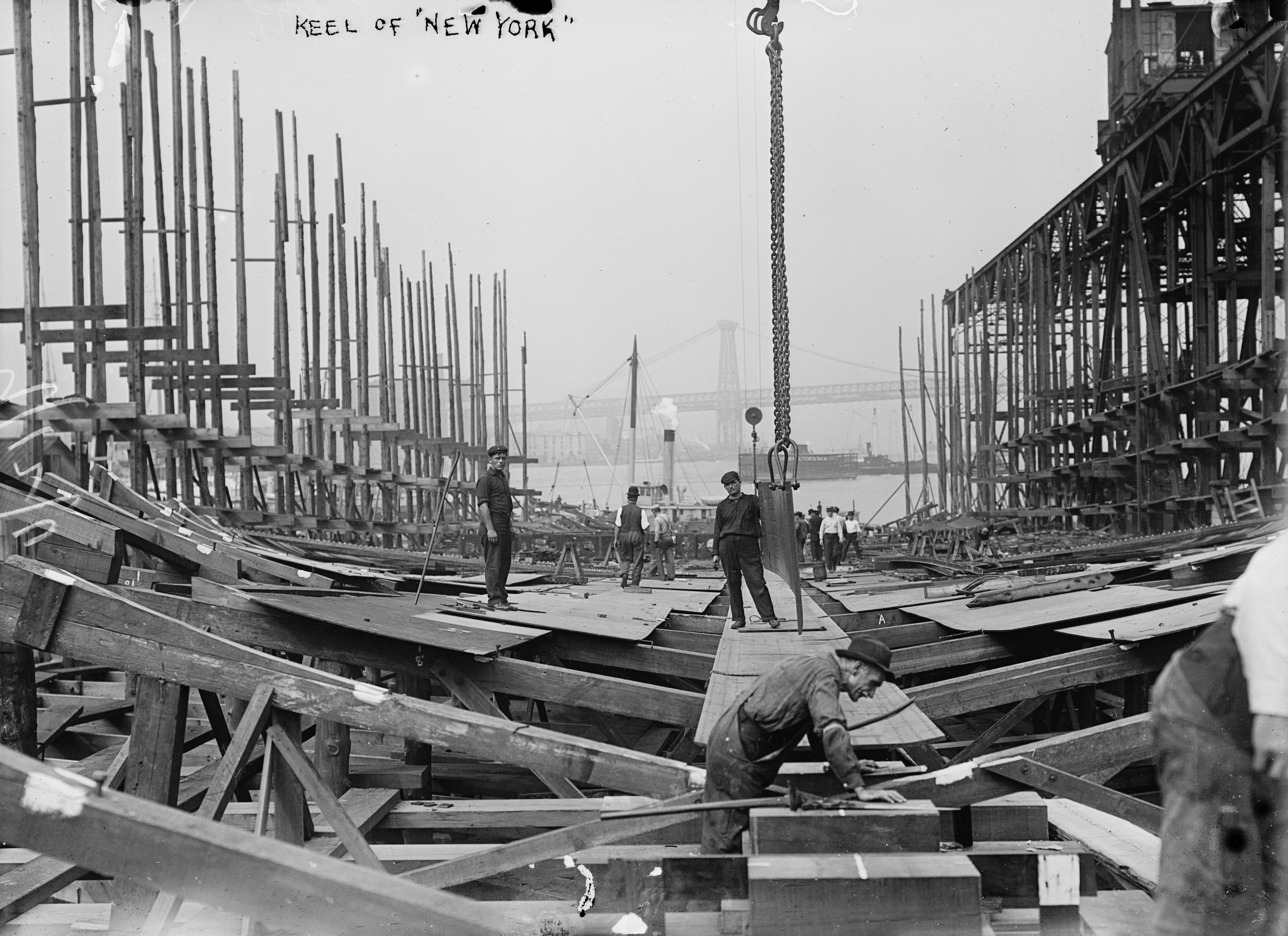
Day after keel ceremony, 12 September 1911

She had a standard displacement of 27,000 long tons (27,433 t) and a full-load displacement of 28,367 long tons (28,822 t). She was 573 ft (175 m) in length overall, 565 ft (172 m) at the waterline, and had a beam of 95 ft 6 in (29.11 m) and a draft of 28 ft 6 in (8.69 m).

She was powered by 14 Babcock & Wilcox boilers driving two dual-acting vertical triple expansion reciprocating steam engines, with 28,000 shp (21,000 kW), with a maximum speed of 21 kn (39 km/h; 24 mph). She had a range of 7,060 nautical miles (13,080 km; 8,120 mi) at 10 kn (19 km/h; 12 mph).

Armor on New York consisted of a belt from 10 to 12 in (250 to 300 mm) thick. Her lower casemate had between 9 and 11 in (230 and 280 mm) of armor, and her upper casemate had 6 in (150 mm) of armor. Deck armor was 2 in (51 mm) thick, and turret armor was 14 in (360 mm) on the face, 4 in (100 mm) on the top, 2 inches on the sides, and 8 in (200 mm) on the rear. Armor on her barbettes was between 10 and 12 inches. Her conning tower was protected by 12 inches of armor, with 4 inches of armor on its top.

Her armament consisted of ten 14-inch/45-caliber guns which could be elevated to 15 degrees, and arrayed in five double mounts designated, from bow to stern, 1, 2, 3, 4, and 5. The class was the last to feature a turret mounted amidships. As built, she also carried twenty-one 5-inch (127 mm)/51-caliber guns, primarily for defense against destroyers and torpedo boats. The 5-inch guns were poor in accuracy in rough seas due to the open casemates mounted in the hull, so the 5-inch armament was reduced to 16 guns in 1918 by removal of the least useful positions near the ends of the ship. The ship was not designed with anti-aircraft (AA) defense in mind, but two 3-inch (76 mm)/50 caliber AA guns were added in 1918. She also had four 21-inch (533 mm) torpedo tubes, 1 each on the port side bow and stern and starboard bow and stern, for the Bliss-Leavitt Mark 3 torpedo. The torpedo rooms held 12 torpedoes total, plus 12 naval defense mines. Her crew consisted of 1,042 officers and enlisted men.

New York was laid down on 11 September 1911, in New York Navy Yard in Brooklyn. The New York class was constructed under new labor laws that limited the working hours of her construction crews. It was also stipulated that each ship cost less than $6,000,000, excluding cost of armor and armament. She was launched on 30 October 1912, and commissioned on 15 May 1914. The fifth ship to be named for New York State, she was sponsored by Elsie Calder, the daughter of New York politician William M. Calder. The fourth New York, an armored cruiser, was renamed Rochester, to free the name for this battleship, and was later scuttled in Subic Bay in 1941. However, the wreck site for that ship, which has become a popular recreational dive site, is still commonly referred to as USS New York.

== Service history ==
Under the command of Captain Thomas S. Rodgers, New York headed straight for Veracruz following its commissioning. She was designated flagship for Rear Admiral Frank Friday Fletcher in July 1914, commanding the fleet occupying and blockading Veracruz to prevent arms shipments from arriving there to support the government of Victoriano Huerta. The United States occupation of Veracruz ultimately ended and New York resumed her shakedown cruise along the East Coast of the United States. She also undertook several goodwill duties, and in December 1915 she held a high-profile Christmas party and dinner for several hundred orphans from New York City, at the suggestion of her crew. It later became a tradition on the ship to help the underprivileged when possible, earning it the nickname "Christmas Ship." Following this duty, she undertook a number of training exercises off the Atlantic coast.

=== World War I ===
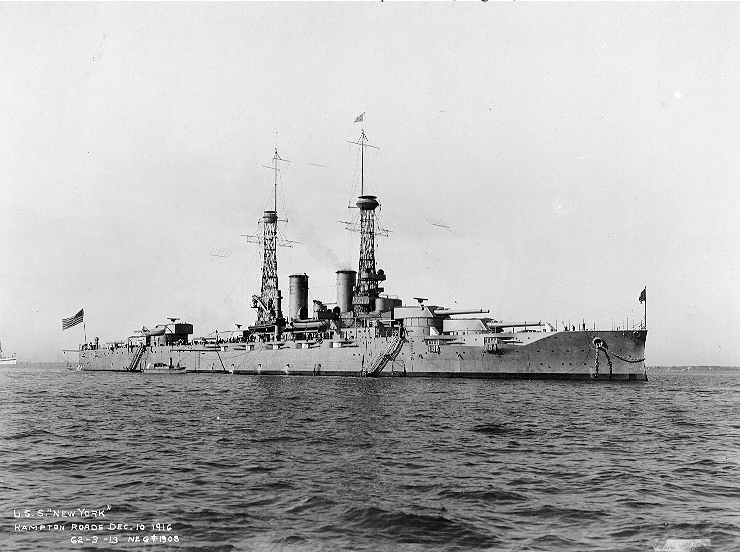
New York in Hampton Roads, Virginia, December 1916

Following the United States' entry into World War I, New York, under the command of Captain Edward L. Beach, Sr., became flagship of Battleship Division 9 (BatDiv 9), commanded by Rear Admiral Hugh Rodman. She was sent to reinforce the British Grand Fleet in the North Sea, arriving at Scapa Flow on 7 December 1917. The ships of the U.S. fleet were assigned to the 6th Battle Squadron in the Grand Fleet, the American ships joined in blockade and escort. In December 1917, New York and the other U.S. battleships took part in several gunnery exercises. New York scored the highest score of the ships for her main battery, with an accuracy of 93.3 percent. Ultimately the New York was the best performer in these exercises, the only ship rated as "excellent" while many of her sisters received mediocre performance reviews.

She did not fire any shots in anger during the war, but does get credit for sinking an enemy vessel. During one of her escort missions, the convoy she was escorting came under two different attacks by German U-boats. On the evening of 14 October 1918, as New York led a group of battleships into the Pentland Firth, she was rocked by a violent underwater collision on her starboard side, followed shortly after by another to the stern that broke off two blades on one of her propellers, reducing the ship to one engine and a speed of 12 kn (14 mph; 22 km/h). It was immediately clear to the men on board that she had struck an underwater object, but the depth of the channel meant it could not have been a shipwreck. Commanders concluded that New York must have accidentally collided with a submerged U-boat. They agreed that the submarine had rammed its bow into the ship's side, then been struck moments later by the ship's propeller. In their opinion, the damage would have been fatal to the German craft. This strange—and accidental—encounter marked the only time in all of Battleship Division Nine's service with the Grand Fleet that one of its ships sank a German vessel.

Badly damaged by the loss of a propeller, the ship sailed to Rosyth under heavy escort for repairs on 15 October. At 01:00 the next morning, a U-boat launched three torpedoes at the damaged vessel, all of which passed ahead of her. Unlike in previous cases, sufficient evidence existed to suppose that this torpedo attack was not a false alarm—a number of officers and men aboard New York clearly saw the wakes of the torpedoes in the full moonlight, and a submarine was spotted in the immediate vicinity by a patrol shortly after the attack. (Note: Jones notes in his dissertation that German records do not contain any report of a torpedo attack upon a battleship on 16 October 1918. He states that the attack may have come from one of the U-boats that were sunk in the area around that time, however.) Ironically, the battleship's wounded condition is possibly what saved her: although standard procedure was to steam at 16 kn (18 mph; 30 km/h), New York could make only 12 kn (14 mph; 22 km/h) on her one operable propeller. Due to this, historian Jerry Jones believes that the U-boat captain misjudged the ship's speed. With no further damage, however, the battleship arrived safely at a drydock in Rosyth. As she was lifted clear of the water, a large dent commensurate with a submarine bow was found in her hull.

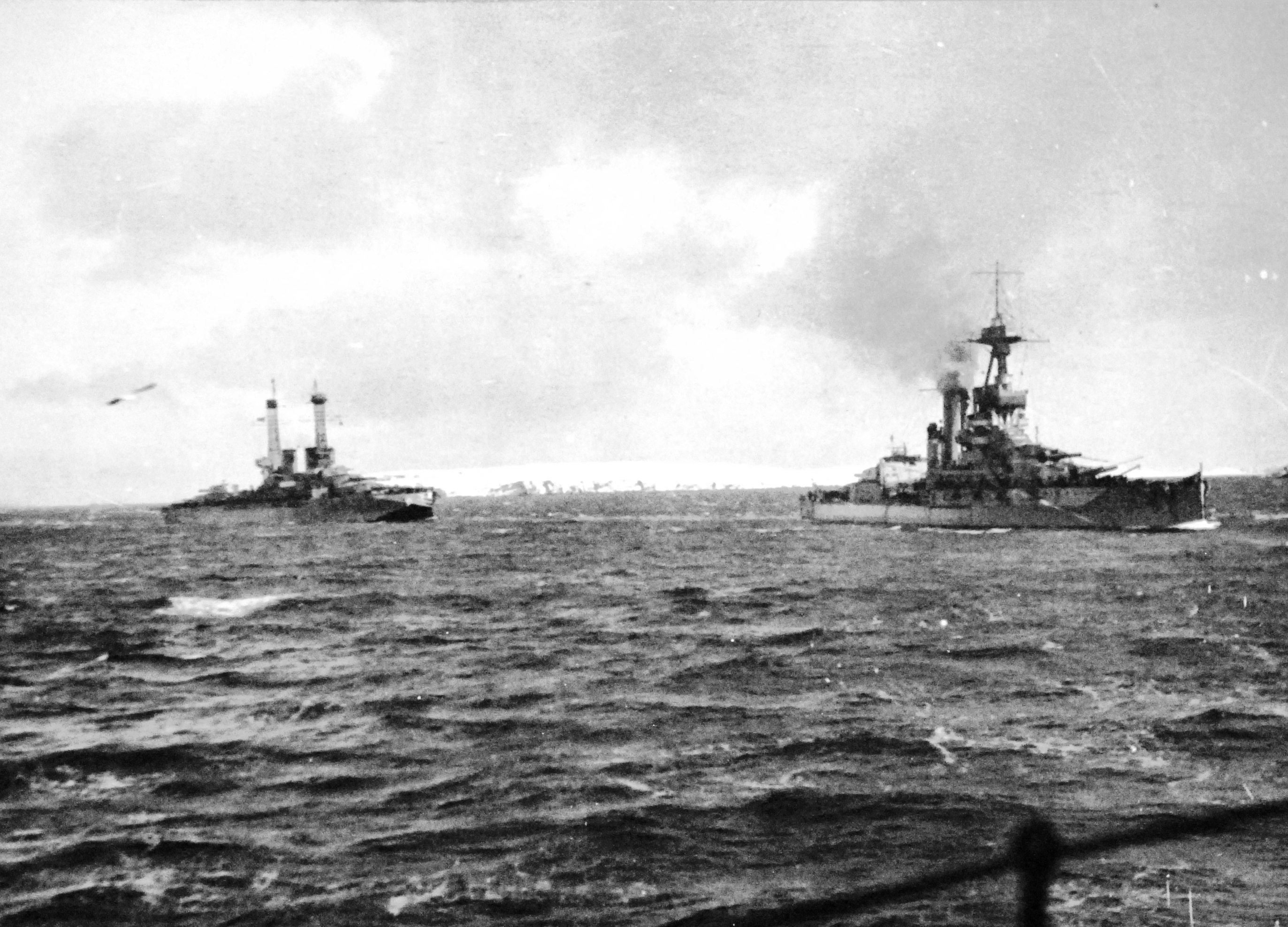
New York (left) and HMS Iron Duke in Scapa Flow, possibly during the surrender of the German fleet, November 1918

New York was also frequently host to foreign dignitaries, including King George V of the United Kingdom and the future Edward VIII, as well as then-prince Hirohito of the Empire of Japan. The ship was of great interest to other European powers, as it was in many cases a first chance to see an American dreadnought up close. She was on hand for the surrender of the German High Seas Fleet on 21 November 1918 in the Firth of Forth, several days after the signing of the Armistice, after which she returned to the United States briefly. She then served as an escort for George Washington, carrying President Woodrow Wilson, on his trip from the United States to Brest, France en route to the Versailles Peace Conference.

=== Interwar period ===
Arriving back in the United States in 1919, she began to undertake training and patrol duties, including at one point to the Caribbean with a number of other U.S. ships. During this year, she also saw a refit in Norfolk Navy Yard where five 5-inch guns were removed and three additional 3-inch/50 caliber AA guns were added, bringing the total to five. The secondary battery was reduced to sixteen 5-inch/51 caliber guns. In late 1919, she sailed to the Pacific Ocean and joined the newly formed United States Pacific Fleet. She continued to conduct training and patrol duties in the Pacific until the mid-1930s when she was transferred again to the Atlantic, and began operating out of the North Atlantic, with the exception of several occasional trips to the West Coast of the United States.

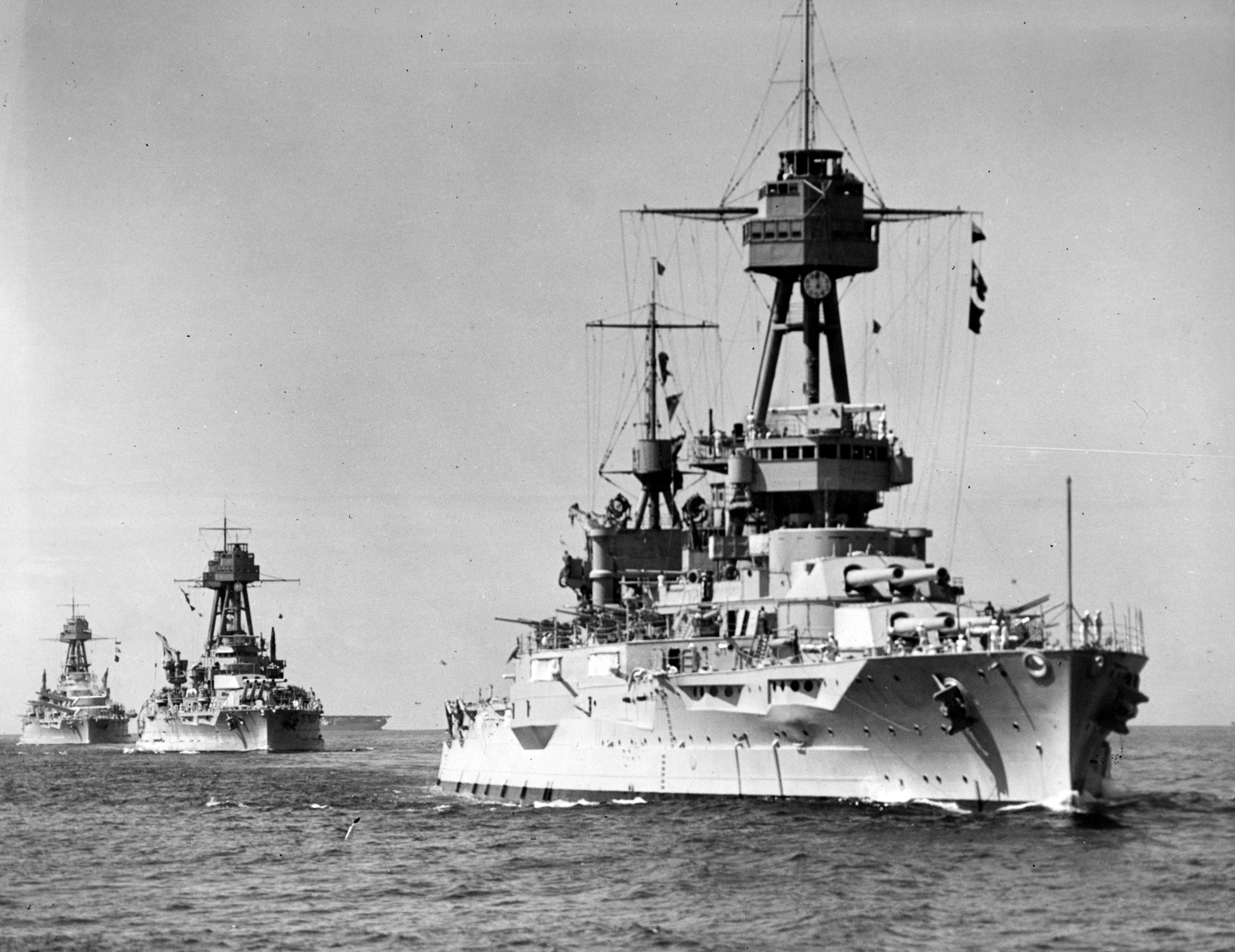
New York on maneuvers with Oklahoma and Nevada, 1932. The carrier Langley can be seen in the background.

In 1926 New York was considered obsolete compared with other battleships in service, so she steamed to Norfolk Navy Yard for a complete refit. While several other battleships in service, including Utah and Florida were converted to training ships or scrapped, New York and Texas were chosen to be overhauled to increase their speed, armor, armament, and propulsion systems as allowed by the Washington Naval Treaty of 1922. An additional 3,000 long tons (3,000 t) were added to her for defense against aerial targets and submarines. The number of 3-inch AA guns was increased to 8, and six of the 5-inch guns were relocated to new casemates on the main deck. The torpedo tubes were removed at this time. Her 14 Babcock & Wilcox coal-fired boilers were replaced with six Bureau Express oil-fired boilers and the twin funnels were trunked into one, aft of the forward superstructure. Tripods were fitted in place of lattice masts, and atop the forward tripod a control tower was installed. A tower was built amidships that contained additional fire control to backup the system on the foremast. A new aircraft catapult was installed atop turret Number 3, and cranes were installed on either side of the funnel for boat and aircraft handling. Additional deck protection was added, and her beam was widened to 106 ft (32 m). She was fitted with anti-torpedo bulges. However, these bulges made maneuvering harder at low speeds, she rolled badly, and her gunfire accuracy was reduced in rough seas. On 4 September 1928, she left for short-range battle drills with Arizona, and from 7 to 10 November the ships traveled to San Francisco together with Pennsylvania. On 3 April 1929 she undertook anti-aircraft practice with Arizona, and then the two ships and Pennsylvania steamed for Cuba, where they stayed until steaming for Hampton Roads on 1 May.

She remained with the Pacific Fleet training as part of the series of Fleet Problems until 1937. That year she was selected to carry now-Admiral Rodman, the President's personal representative for the coronation of King George VI and Queen Elizabeth, and New York took part in the Grand Naval Review of 20 May 1937 as sole U.S. Navy representative. In 1937, eight 1.1-inch (28 mm)/75 caliber AA guns in two quadruple mounts were added to improve the light AA armament. New York was fitted with XAF radar in February 1938, including the first United States duplexer so a single antenna could both send and receive. This made her the second ship to be outfitted with radar after the destroyer Leary. The tests conducted on New York led to similar radars being installed on the Brooklyn-class and St. Louis-class cruisers as well as newer battleship West Virginia. For several years, she served primarily as a training ship for midshipmen and newly enlisted sailors.

In September 1939, New York joined the Neutrality Patrol, safeguarding sea lanes in the North Atlantic, and served as flagship with the Atlantic Squadron, later redesignated the United States Atlantic Fleet, for the next 27 months. In July 1941, she protected a convoy of U.S. troops moving to garrison Iceland. She was in the midst of a refit on 7 December 1941, when the Imperial Japanese Navy attacked Pearl Harbor, sinking many of the battleships in the U.S. Pacific Fleet and bringing the United States into World War II.

=== World War II ===
With the outbreak of war, New York's overhaul was sped up and completed four weeks after the attack on Pearl Harbor. She returned to duty escorting cargo and troop ships to Iceland and Scotland. She continued on patrol duty for the next year. In her first series of escorts, she left Norfolk 15 February, arrived in New York 16 February, Nova Scotia 21 February, and Iceland 2 March, returning to Norfolk on 27 March. She left there on her second patrol 24 April and arrived at New York the next day, Nova Scotia 2 May, Newfoundland 5 May, and Iceland 10 May, returning to New York on 20 May. The next day she left for a third escort, arriving again at Nova Scotia on 2 June and Scotland on 10 June, returning to Norfolk on 30 June. Following these three escort missions, she put in for overhaul in Norfolk. The secondary battery was reduced to six 5-inch (127 mm) guns and the anti-aircraft armament was increased to ten 3-inch/50 caliber guns, 24 40 mm (1.6 in) Bofors guns in quadruple mounts, and 42 20 mm (0.79 in) Oerlikon cannons. She departed Norfolk on 12 August and arrived the next day at New York. From there, she escorted a convoy to Nova Scotia where she remained until 22 August, then departed for Scotland where she was from 31 August to 5 September. She returned to Norfolk on 15 September.

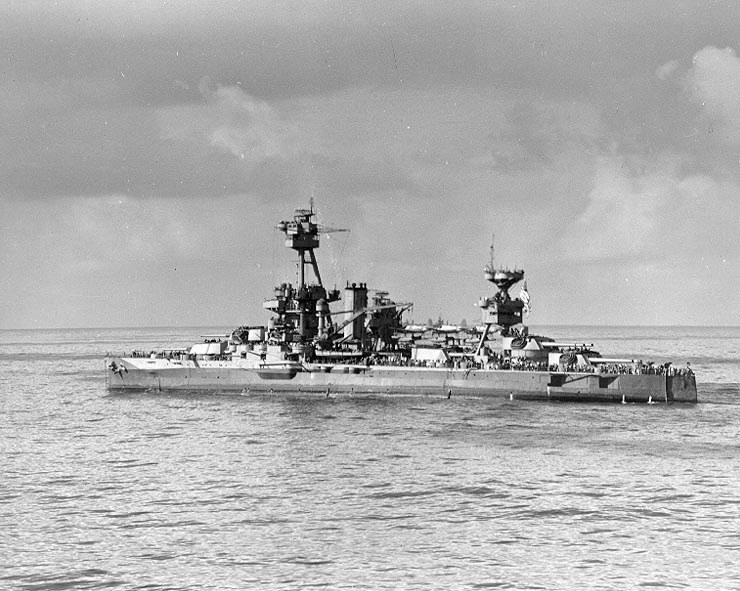
New York off North Africa just after the battle at Casablanca

New York saw her first major action during Operation Torch, the Allied invasion of North Africa in November 1942. Under the command of Captain Scott Umsted, she left Norfolk on 23 October in order to join the Allied fleet. Attached to the Southern Attack Group, on 8 November, New York and the cruiser Philadelphia, screened by six destroyers, attacked Safi harbor in Morocco, supporting landings by the U.S. 9th Infantry Division's 47th Infantry Regiment, and defended the transports Cole and Bernadou which came under attack by 130-millimeter (5.1 in) shore batteries at Point De La Tour. New York fired several salvoes with her 14-inch (360 mm) guns, with one of them striking the base of the battery and ricocheting into a bunker, destroying the range finder and killing the battery commander and neutralizing the battery. Other shore batteries were destroyed by Philadelphia's guns and aircraft from escort carrier Santee. New York remained on station until the port was secure, then steamed north to support the Center Group off Fedhala and Casablanca, specifically to deal with the threat of the Vichy French battleship Jean Bart, but by the time she arrived, that battleship had been disabled by Massachusetts and other Vichy French ships had been driven off by Brooklyn and Augusta. New York remained on off the coast of North Africa until the beaches were secure, then retired on 14 November. She had expended a total of sixty 14-inch (360 mm) rounds. She returned to Norfolk on 23 November.

New York next returned to convoy patrol. She escorted two convoys to Casablanca from the United States during late 1942, leaving Norfolk on 24 November and in New York from 25 November to 12 December, Casablanca from 24 to 29 December, and back in Norfolk on 12 January 1943. She left Norfolk on the second escort on 26 February, in New York from 27 February to 5 March, in Casablanca from 18 to 25 March, and back to New York from 5 April to 1 May. In 1943 she was selected for a refit to become a main battery and escort training center. She arrived in Portland, Maine on 2 May, where she remained until 27 July. During her fourth and final refit in early 1943 her anti-aircraft battery was increased to ten 3-inch/50 caliber guns, forty 40 mm and thirty-six 20 mm guns. Improved fire control was added as well, and this ultimately increased her displacement to 29,340 long tons (29,810 t) standard and 34,000 long tons (35,000 t) full-load. She returned to Norfolk on 2 August 1943. She was used to train crews from the US Navy, US Coast Guard, and Allied navies on the 14-inch/45 caliber gun, the 3-inch/50 caliber gun, and the 20 mm and 40 mm guns, primarily because many newer ships used these weapons. Between July 1943 and June 1944 about 11,000 enlisted men and 750 officers trained on her in this capacity. However, the duty lowered morale among the crew and a large number of requests for transfer were put in. Following this duty, she was sent to the US Naval Academy and undertook three consecutive midshipmen cruises ferrying a total of 1,800 midshipmen from Annapolis to Trinidad between June and August 1944.

==== Pacific theater ====
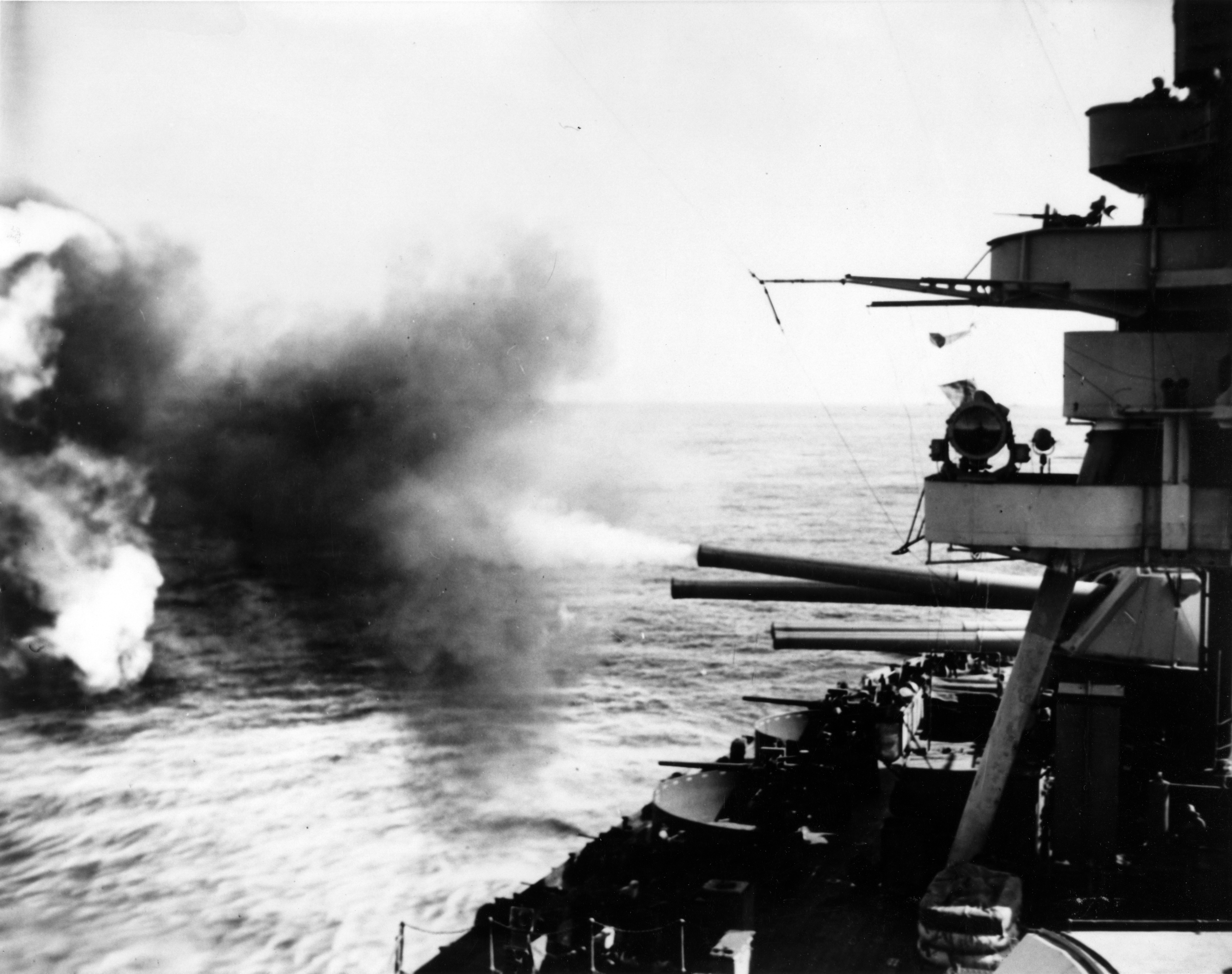
New York firing her 14-inch main guns on Iwo Jima on 16 February 1945

Selected to return to action in the Pacific Theater in late 1944, she transited the Panama Canal on 27 November, and arrived in Long Beach, California on 9 December, breaking down at least once along the way and losing an observation plane in bad weather. She conducted refresher training off Southern California in December 1944 and January 1945. New York departed 12 January and rendezvoused with Idaho, Tennessee, Nevada, Texas, and Arkansas, forming a support force for the invasion of Iwo Jima. New York lost a blade off her port screw just before the invasion began and briefly put in for temporary repairs at Eniwetok from 5 to 7 February. She returned to the group, which was near Saipan, on 11 February. Together, they arrived at Iwo Jima on 16 February and began the pre-invasion bombardment. During the three days of shore bombardment that followed, New York expended 6,417 rounds, including 1,037 14-inch rounds. One of her salvoes struck the primary ammunition dump on the island, causing "the most spectacular secondary explosion in the campaign." She retired from the area on 19 February and arrived at Ulithi on 21 February.

After a permanent repair to her port propeller at Manus from 28 February to 19 March, she rejoined Task Force 54 at Ulithi on 22 March in preparation for the invasion of Okinawa. Joined by Maryland, Colorado, and West Virginia, the fleet of battleships began its bombardment of Okinawa on 27 March. Providing shore bombardment, and later naval artillery support for ground forces, New York was on station for 76 consecutive days, during which she expended 4,159 rounds of 14-inch ammunition and 7,001 rounds of 5-inch ammunition. She was subjected to a kamikaze attack on 14 April which destroyed one spotting plane on its catapult, but the Japanese aircraft crashed 50 yd (46 m) from the ship and New York received only superficial damage, suffering two men injured. She was detached on 11 June, her gun barrels having been worn out by fire, and proceeded to Pearl Harbor to have her guns relined in preparation for the invasion of mainland Japan. She stopped by Leyte on 14 June and arrived at Pearl Harbor on 1 July. She was in the harbor on 15 August, the end of the war.

During World War II, New York spent 1,088 days with the Atlantic Fleet from December 1941 to November 1944, and 276 days with the Pacific Fleet. She expended a total of 53,094 rounds of all types totaling 3,548.9 short tons (3,219.5 t), traveled 123,867 mi (199,345 km), spent 414 days underway, and consumed 22,367,996 US gal (84,672,080 L; 18,625,253 imp gal) of fuel oil.

=== Post-war ===
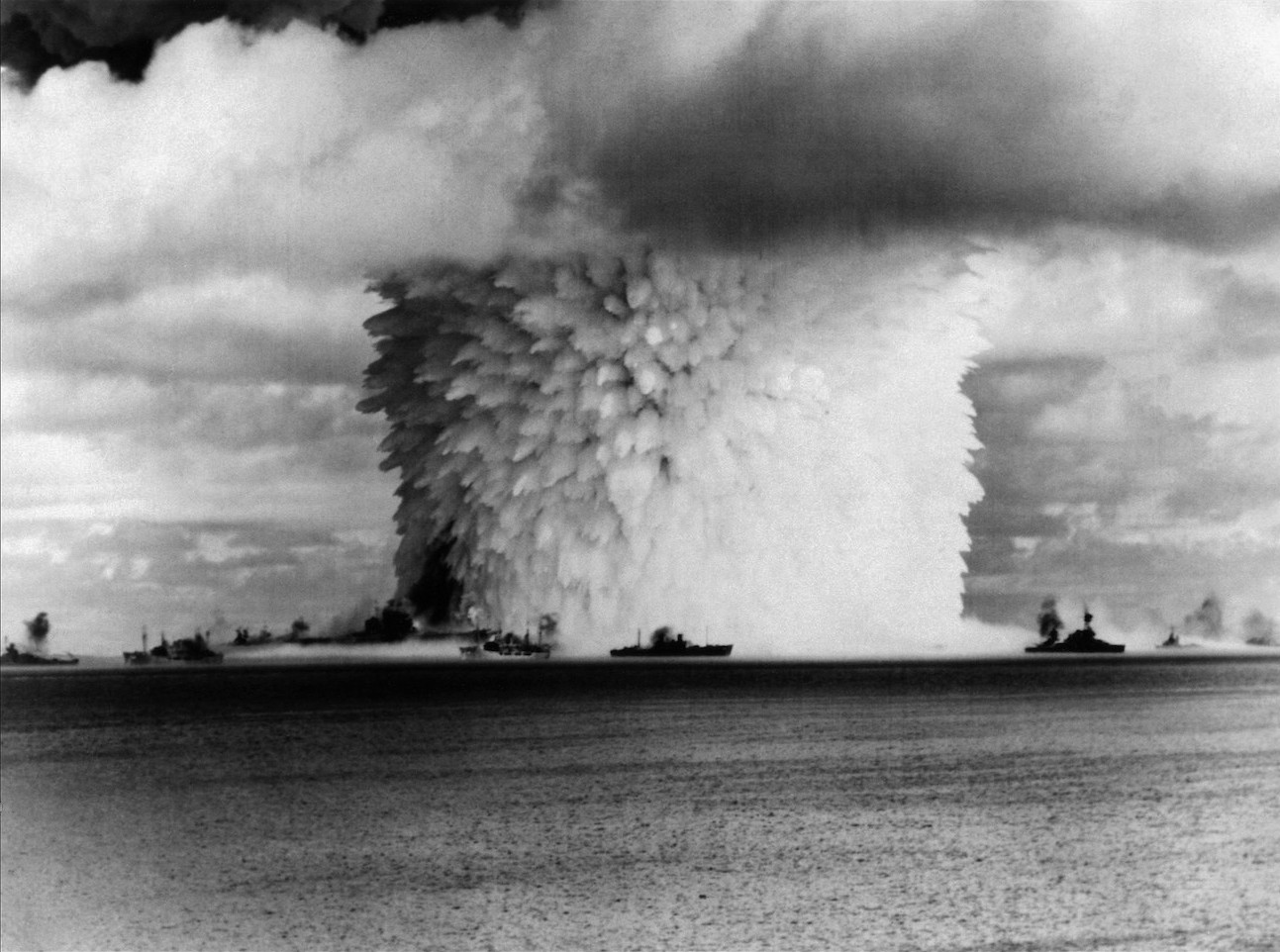
The Baker shot of Operation Crossroads, Bikini Atoll, 25 July 1946. New York can be seen just to the right of the explosion column.

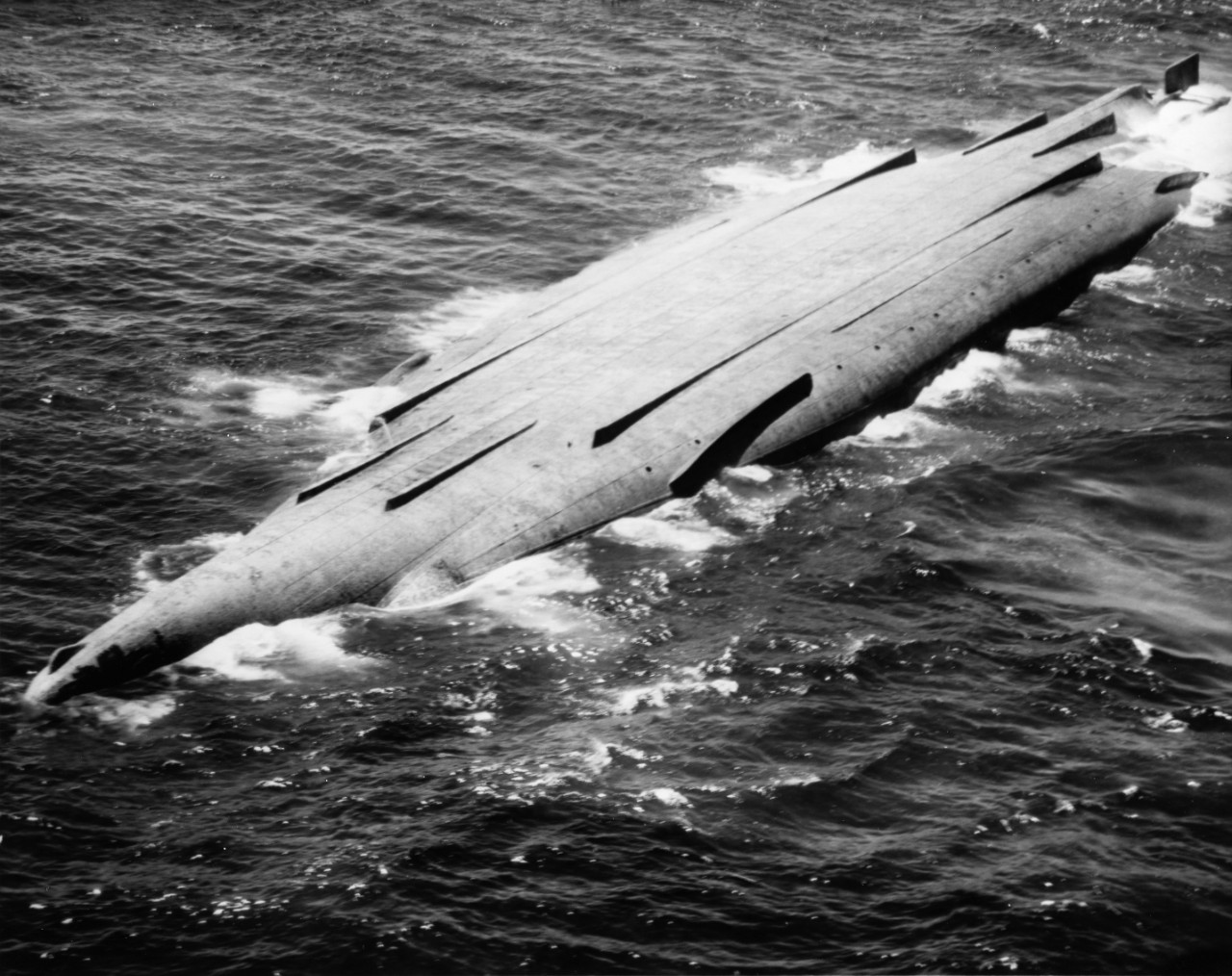
New York capsizes after serving as a target ship off Hawaii, 8 July 1948.

Following the end of the war, New York entered the Operation Magic Carpet fleet, leaving Pearl Harbor on 2 September and arriving at San Pedro on 9 September with a load of veterans embarked. She then proceeded to New York City to take part in Navy Day celebrations.

Selected as a test ship for Operation Crossroads, she was used in nuclear bomb tests at Bikini Atoll in July 1946 with about 70 other ships, surviving both the Able and Baker tests. Following these tests, she was towed to Pearl Harbor to study the effects of the bomb blasts on her. On 6 July 1948, she was towed out to sea and used as target practice, and was sunk by several naval aircraft and ships.

== Honors and awards ==
- Mexican Service Medal
- World War I Victory Medal with GRAND FLEET Clasp
- American Defense Service Medal
- European–African–Middle Eastern Campaign Medal with one battle star
- Asiatic-Pacific Campaign Medal with two battle stars
- World War II Victory Medal
