= XAF radar =

The XAF was an experimental radar set constructed in 1938, which survived World War II as a historical artifact, and is now placed on exhibit at the National Electronics Museum, located in Linthicum, Maryland.

== Creation and development ==
The XAF—an experimental radar set that resulted from several years' technical progress by the Naval Research Laboratory (NRL)—was constructed in 1938, following a late February decision to experimentally install a radar set on a major warship. Operating at 200 MHz (1.5 metre wavelength) at a power of 15 kilowatts, the XAF featured a "bedspring"-like antenna about 17 feet square. This was mounted in a rotating yoke that allowed it to scan around the horizon, and to elevate to keep the radio beam parallel to the surface of the water when the ship rolled. This large antenna and yoke had to be strong enough for sea service, while remaining as light as possible to avoid excessive topside weight. Accordingly, the Brewster Aeronautical Corporation (then also building the Navy's first monoplane carrier fighter, the F2A "Buffalo"), was given the job of fabricating a suitable duralumin structure. The XAF's transmitter, receiver and other equipment were fabricated by the NRL.

== Testing ==
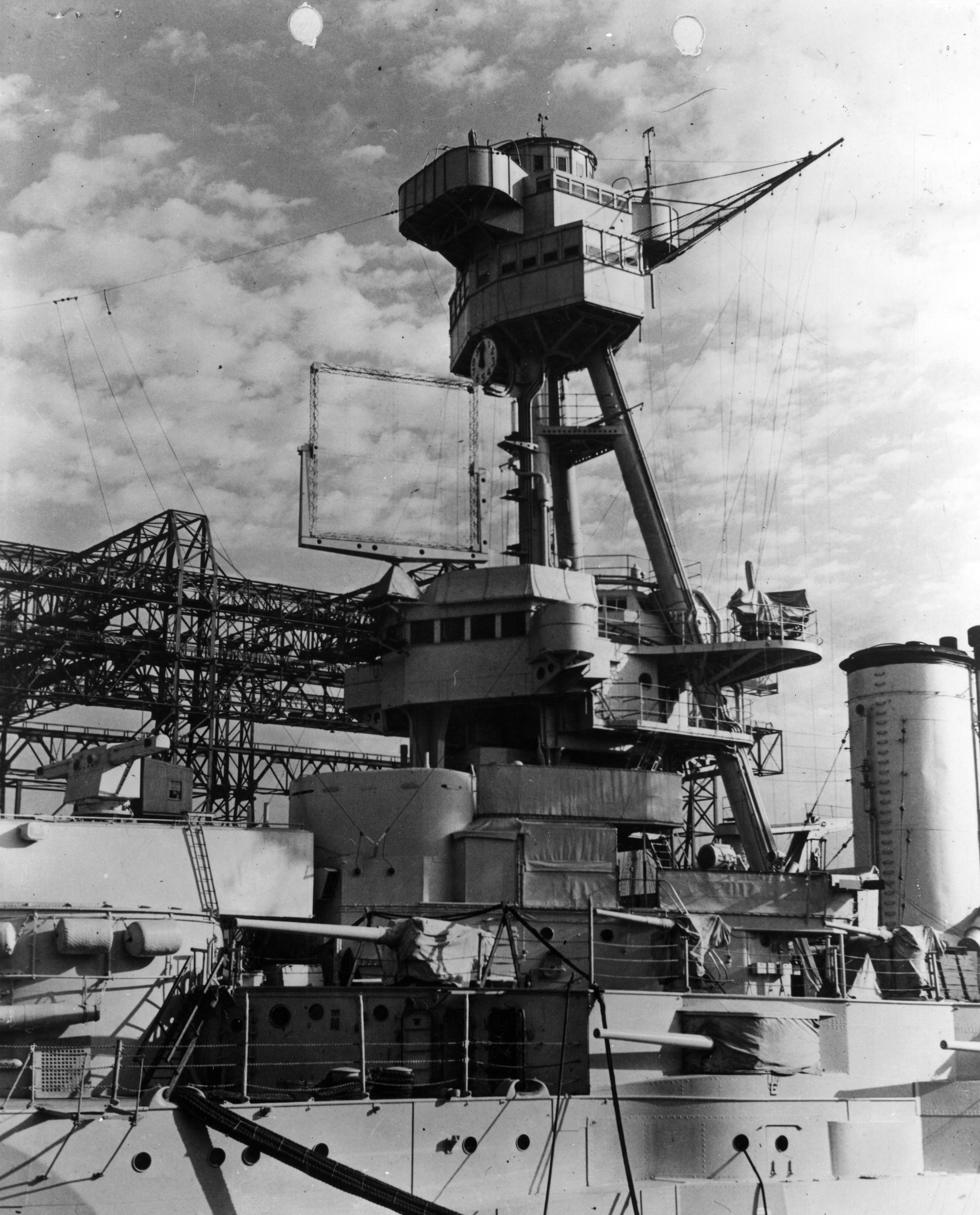
Antenna of the XAF radar visible atop New York's pilot house, c. late 1938 or early 1939

When development and construction were complete, the XAF was installed on the battleship New York. This work, with the antenna mounted atop the pilothouse (displacing a large optical rangefinder, which was moved to the top of the ship's No. 2 14-inch gun turret) was completed in December 1938. During nearly three months of constant operation, averaging almost twenty hours daily as New York participated in winter maneuvers and battle practice in the Caribbean, the XAF's performance and reliability exceeded expectations. It detected aircraft up to 100 nautical miles (nm) away and ships out to 15 nm. The radar was also employed for navigation and in gunnery practice, giving very accurate range and azimuth direction, allowing for accurate targeting of enemy vessels and detection of nearby land or obstructions even at night or in the fog.

== Use and evolution ==
At the conclusion of these tests, New York's Commanding Officer recommended installation of radar in all aircraft carriers (whose huge cost, military value and vulnerability to surprise air attack was very well understood), while the Commander of the Atlantic Squadron commented "The XAF equipment is one of the most important military developments since the advent of radio ...". Later in 1939, the XAF was reengineered and placed in production by the Radio Corporation of America (RCA). Designated CXAM, six of these production models were delivered in 1940 and installed on the aircraft carrier Yorktown, the battleship California, and four cruisers. An improved version, CXAM-1, with a simplified antenna, was produced in greater numbers. By the time the United States entered World War II in December 1941, the use of radar in the U.S. Navy was rapidly expanding.

== On exhibit ==
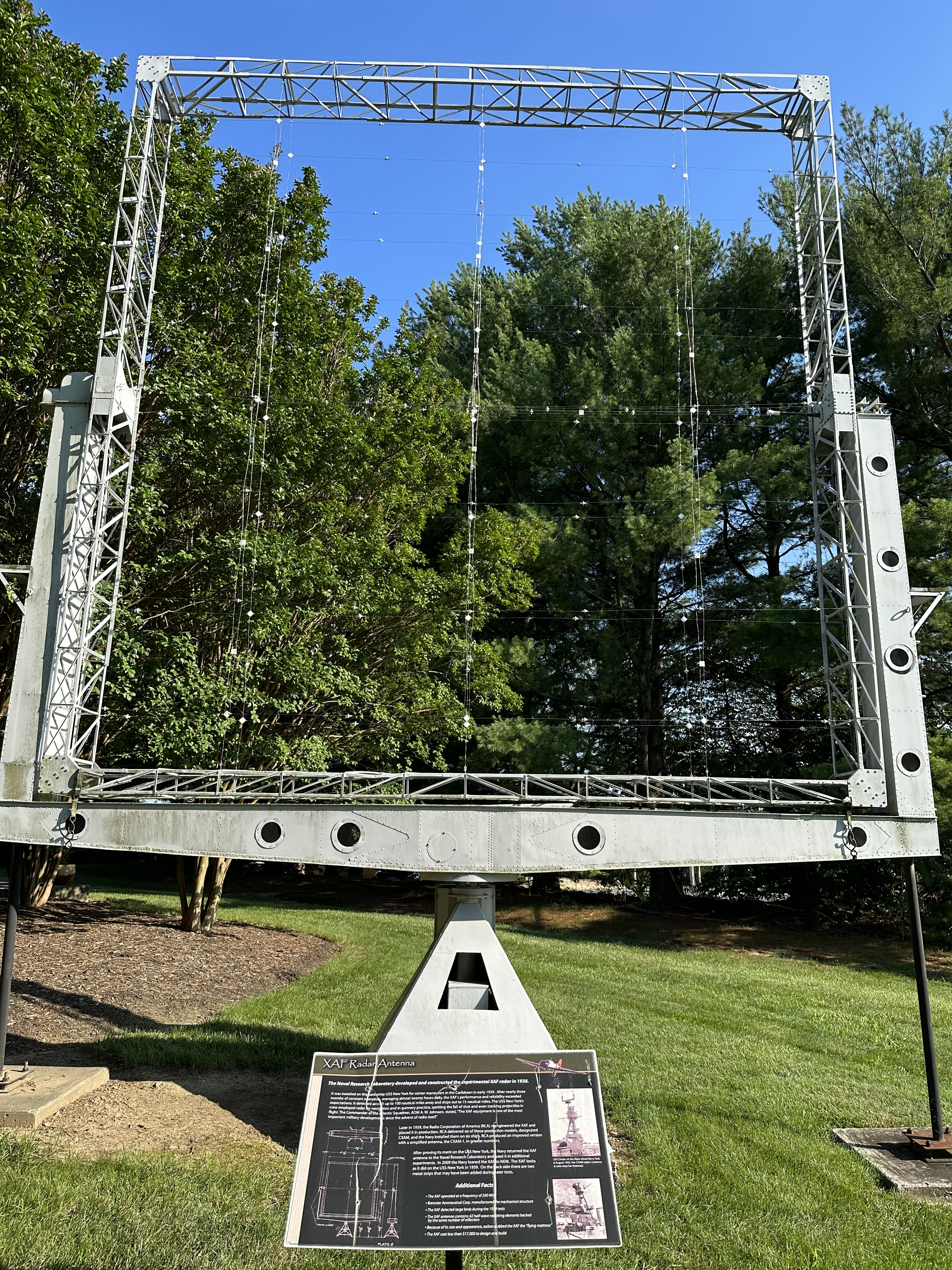
XAF radar antenna exhibited at the National Electronics Museum, as seen in 2023

The XAF radar's antenna survived World War II as a historic artefact. For several decades in the middle and later Twentieth Century it was exhibited in Willard Park, close to the Washington Navy Yard's waterfront. However, the outdoor environment contributed to serious deterioration in the antenna's condition, and it was placed in storage in the mid-1990s. In May 2008 it was loaned to the Historical Electronics Museum, located in Linthicum, Maryland, where it was again placed on public exhibit.
