= New Mexico-class battleship =

Dreadnought battleship class of the United States Navy

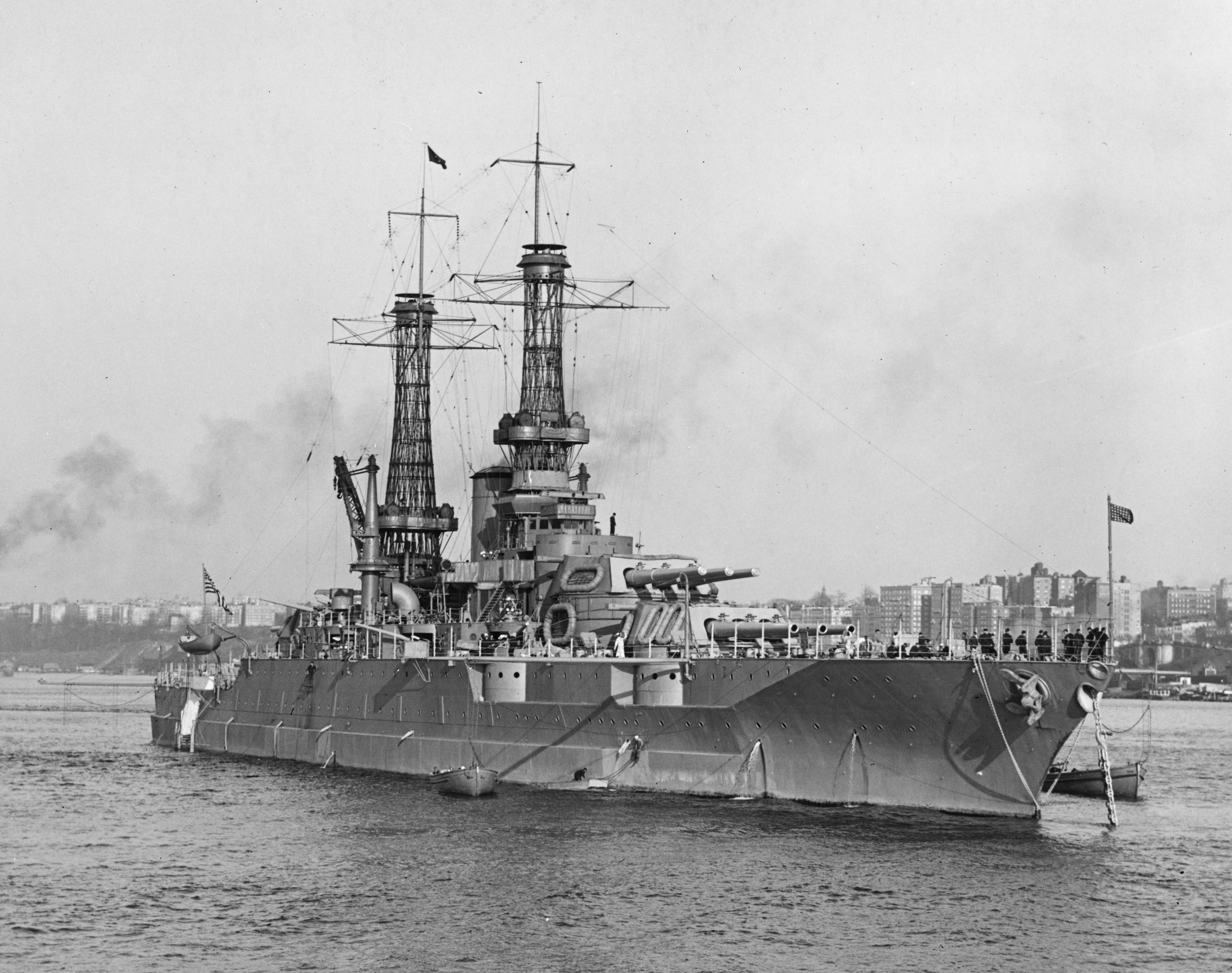
- Mississippi, c. 1918

Class overview
- Name: New Mexico-class battleship
- Builders: New York Naval Shipyard; Newport News Shipbuilding; New York Shipbuilding Corporation
- Operators: United States
- Preceded by: Pennsylvania class
- Succeeded by: Tennessee class
- Built: 1915–1919
- In commission: 1917–1956
- Completed: 3
- Retired: 3

General characteristics
- Type: Dreadnought battleship
- Displacement: Normal: 32,000 long tons (32,514 t); Full load: 33,000 long tons (33,530 t)
- Length: 624 ft (190 m)
- Beam: 97 ft 5 in (29.7 m)
- Draft: 30 ft (9.1 m)
- Installed power: 9 × Babcock & Wilcox boilers; 32,000 shp (24,000 kW)
- Propulsion: 4 × steam turbines; 4 × screw propellers
- Speed: 21 kn (24 mph; 39 km/h)
- Complement: 1,081 officers and men
- Armament: 12 × 14 in (356 mm)/50 cal guns; 14 × 5 in (127 mm)/51 cal guns; 8 × 3 in (76 mm)/50 cal guns; 2 × 21 in (533 mm) torpedo tubes
- Armor: Belt: 8–13.5 in (203–343 mm); Turret face: 18 in (457 mm); Conning tower: 11.5 in (292 mm); Decks: 3.5 in (89 mm)

The New Mexico class was a class of three dreadnought battleships built for the United States Navy in the late 1910s. The class comprised three ships: New Mexico, the lead ship, Mississippi, and Idaho. Part of the standard series, they were in most respects copies of the Pennsylvania-class battleships that immediately preceded them, carrying over the same main battery arrangement of twelve 14-inch (356 mm) guns, but now increased to 50-caliber. They incorporated several other improvements, including a better arrangement of the secondary battery that increased its usability, a clipper bow that improved seakeeping, and an experimental turbo-electric propulsion system adopted on New Mexico. Like the other standard-type battleships, they had a top speed of 21 knots (39 km/h; 24 mph) that allowed the fleet to operate as a tactically homogeneous unit.

All three ships spent the bulk of their peacetime careers in the Pacific Fleet; throughout the 1920s and 1930s, they were involved in numerous Fleet Problems, which were large-scale training exercises that helped develop the doctrine later employed during the Pacific War. By 1941, the three ships were moved to the East Coast to join the Neutrality Patrols that protected American merchant ships from German U-boat attacks during the Battle of the Atlantic. Following the Japanese attack on Pearl Harbor in December, they were quickly transferred back to the Pacific, though they spent most of 1942 escorting convoys off the west coast of the United States. Beginning in mid-1943, they supported amphibious operations during the Aleutian Islands, Gilbert and Marshall Islands, and the Mariana and Palau Islands Campaigns. The Philippines Campaign followed in late 1944, though Mississippi was the only member of the class to participate in the early stages of the campaign, the other vessels being under refit at the time. There, she was present for the Battle of Surigao Strait on 24 October, the last battleship engagement in history.

Mississippi and New Mexico took part in the Invasion of Lingayen Gulf, part of the Philippines Campaign, in early 1945 and both were hit by kamikazes. As they were both under repair, only Idaho participated in the Battle of Iwo Jima, but all three ships were part of the bombardment force for the Battle of Okinawa, where all were damaged by kamikazes. They were present for the occupation of Japan in August and September, thereafter returning to the United States. New Mexico and Idaho were quickly decommissioned and sold for scrap, but Mississippi remained in service, having been converted into a gunnery testing and training ship. In this capacity, her crew experimented with anti-aircraft missiles in the mid-1950s before the ship was sold to ship breakers in 1956.

== Design ==
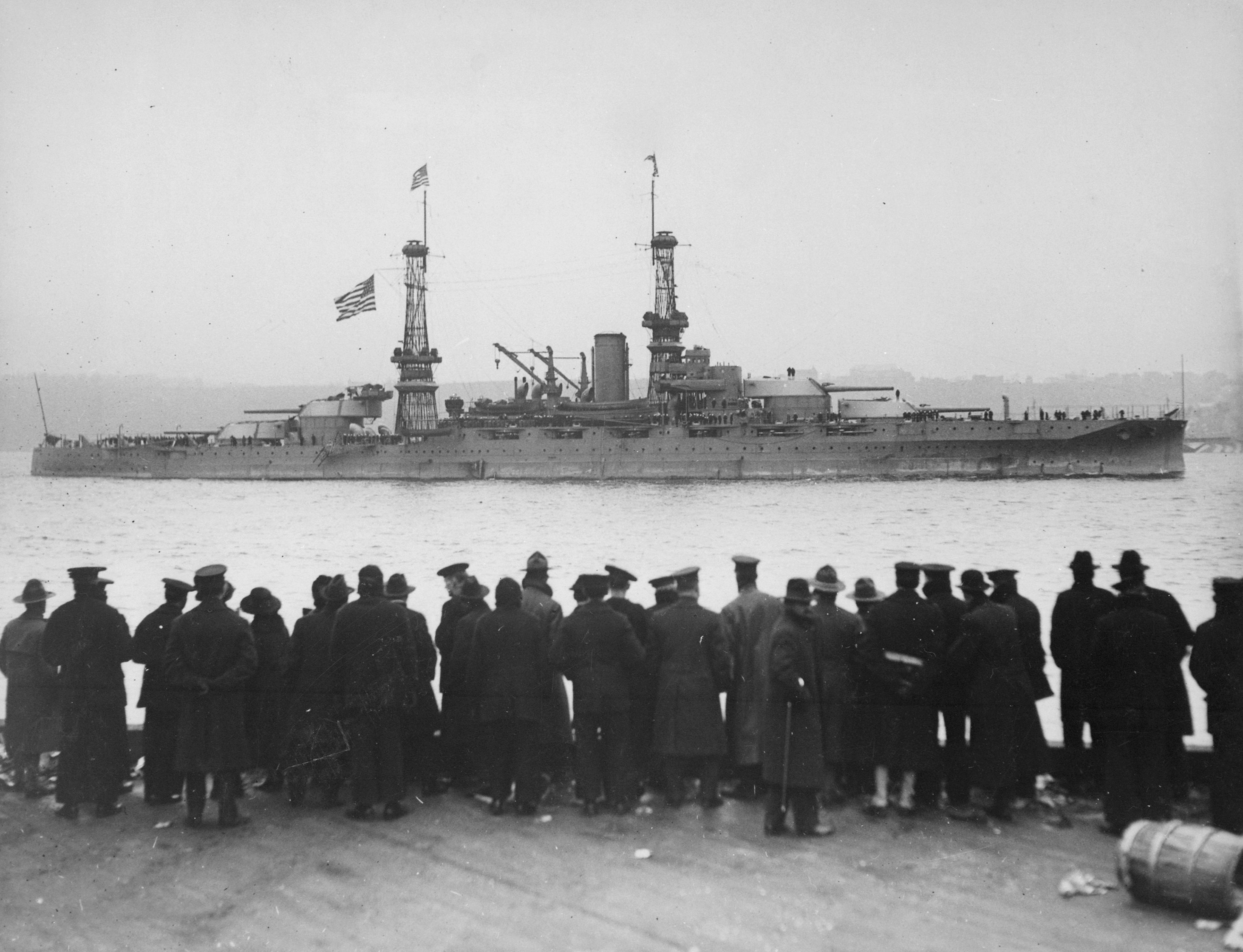
USS Arizona, the second member of the Pennsylvania class, which provided the basis for the New Mexico class

In the early 1910s, the US Navy began experimenting with 16-inch (406 mm) guns as other navies began to move to 15-inch (381 mm) weapons. As development of the new guns progressed, the Navy evaluated a series of proposals for ships incorporating 16-inch guns. The first was a ten-gun ship with five twin-gun turrets that also included improved armor compared to earlier battleships. Additionally, the secondary battery was increased from the standard US armament of 5-inch (127 mm) guns to 6-inch (152 mm) weapons. Another smaller version with eight 16-inch guns was also suggested, along with a design mounting the then-standard 14-inch (356 mm) gun. As work on the new design progressed, the cost of the vessels increased significantly. Compared to the cost of a 14-inch-gunned ship—$12 million—the eight-gun ship was estimated to cost $16.5 million, while the price for the ten-gun ship rose to $19 million.

Even before trials of the new guns had been completed, Rear Admiral Joseph Strauss, then the Chief of the Bureau of Ordnance (BuOrd), argued in 1913 that the 16-inch gun was not worth pursuing; he argued that at the expected battle ranges of the day, the 14-inch gun was capable of penetrating heavy armor plate just as effectively and that a ship carrying twelve of those guns had a much better chance of hitting than a ship with eight 16-inch guns. The General Board concurred and instructed the designers to work on the 14-inch ship. Existing turrets for those guns used a single recoil slide for all three guns, which caused concern that a single hit could jam it and thus disable all three guns. Strauss accordingly suggested that the designers at the Bureau of Construction and Repair, under Chief Constructor Richard Watt, incorporate independent slides.

The design staff submitted two proposals on 21 November 1913: a 35,500-long-ton (36,100 t) version and a 33,200-long-ton (33,700 t) variant. The first incorporated a secondary battery of twenty 6-inch guns, while the smaller one retained twenty-two of the standard 5-inch guns. Weight savings were also achieved by reducing the thickness of the barbette and belt armor by an inch, and reducing fuel capacity. The General Board preferred the larger of the two, citing the heavier armor as needed to defeat the latest 15-inch guns being adopted in foreign battleships and the stronger secondary battery, which they viewed as necessary to ward off long-range torpedo attacks by destroyers. Secretary of the Navy Josephus Daniels disagreed, and on 3 January 1914, rejected the design owing to its higher cost. Instead, he ordered the Navy to accept a repeat of the preceding Pennsylvania class, which might be fitted with separate slides for the main guns.

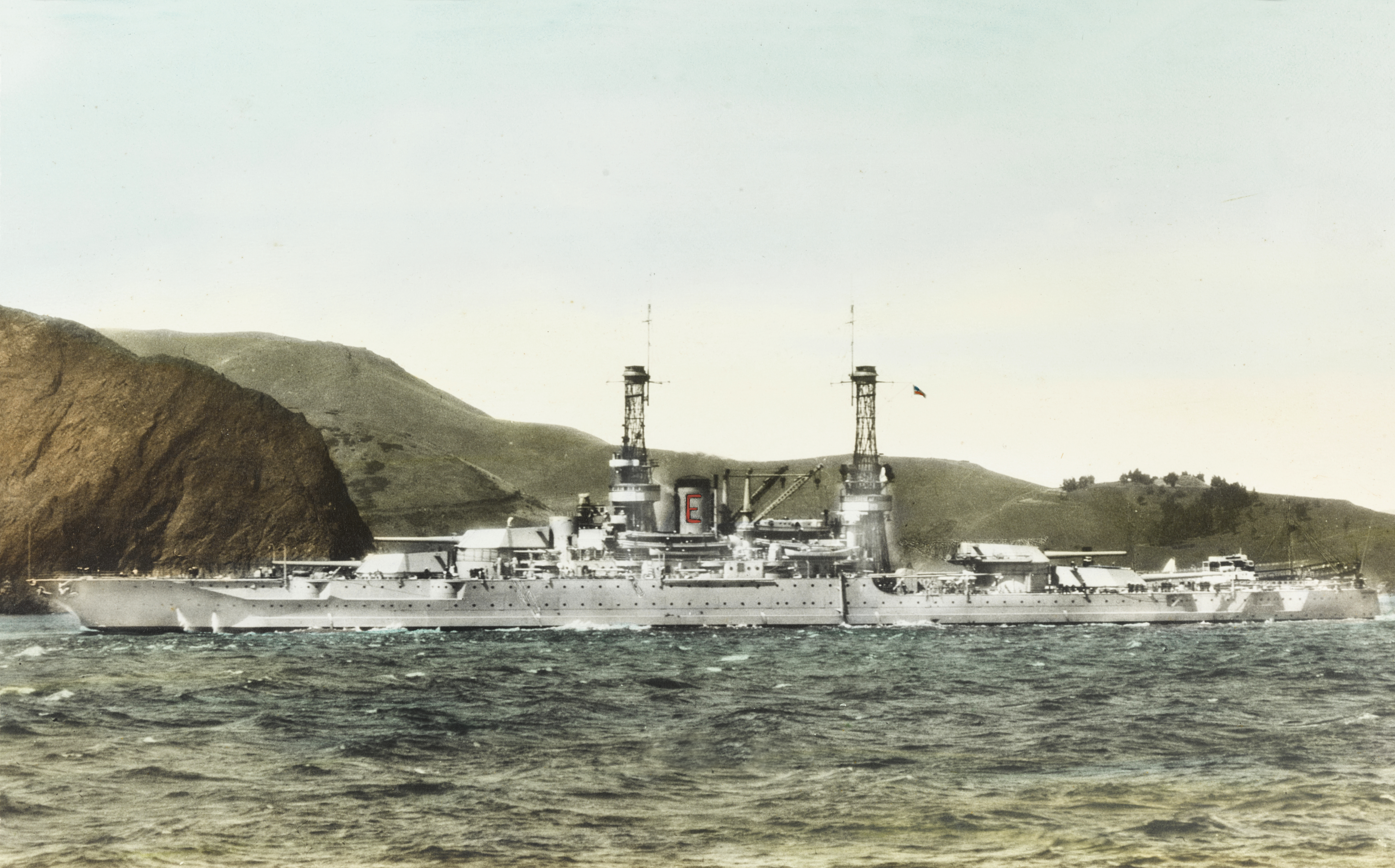
Colorized photograph of Mississippi; note the strong resemblance to Arizona

Work on the design continued through the year; the designers were concerned that earlier battleships were too "wet" forward, leading to the adoption of a clipper bow to reduce the tendency to ship water in heavy seas. Additionally, experience with existing ships had revealed that the secondary battery, mounted in casemates in the forecastle deck, were effectively unusable in rough sea conditions. The designers therefore moved eighteen of the guns a deck higher and further aft, where they would be less prone to being washed out. Weight savings elsewhere allowed the designers to strengthen the main deck and the transverse bulkhead at either end of the belt. Daniels approved these changes on 2 July, and the following month, BuOrd suggested a newly developed 50-caliber version of 14-inch gun be used, which Watt authorized in September. The longer gun produced a higher muzzle velocity, which allowed the shells to penetrate an additional 2 in (51 mm) of armor at 10,000 yd (9,100 m). By this time, work on the design stopped, as bids for the contracts were to be submitted starting on 6 October.

Despite the fact that the offer period had opened, one more major change to the design was made. At the time, the standard propulsion system for warships relied on steam turbines to turn propeller shafts, though turbines operated most efficiently at high speed, while the propellers generated thrust most effectively at relatively low speed. One solution to this problem was turbo-electric transmission, which used the turbines to generate electric power that in turn powered electric motors that drove the screws. The Bureau of Steam Engineering (BuEng) recommended the new system on 17 October, pointing out that it would have many advantages over traditional direct-drive systems, including greater fuel economy and lighter and smaller machinery, which could be used to shorten the armored box that protected the ships' vitals. Also, since the turbines would only need to spin in one direction, simpler machinery without reverse gears could be used. Daniels was convinced, and he approved the change for New Mexico on 10 November. Since this was an unproven technology, the other two members of the class received geared turbine systems.

Congress authorized two ships for the class—New Mexico and Mississippi—but in mid-1914, the two Mississippi-class pre-dreadnoughts were sold to the Greek Navy, and the US Navy was able to use the funds generated by their sale to fund a third member of the class, Idaho.

=== General characteristics and machinery ===
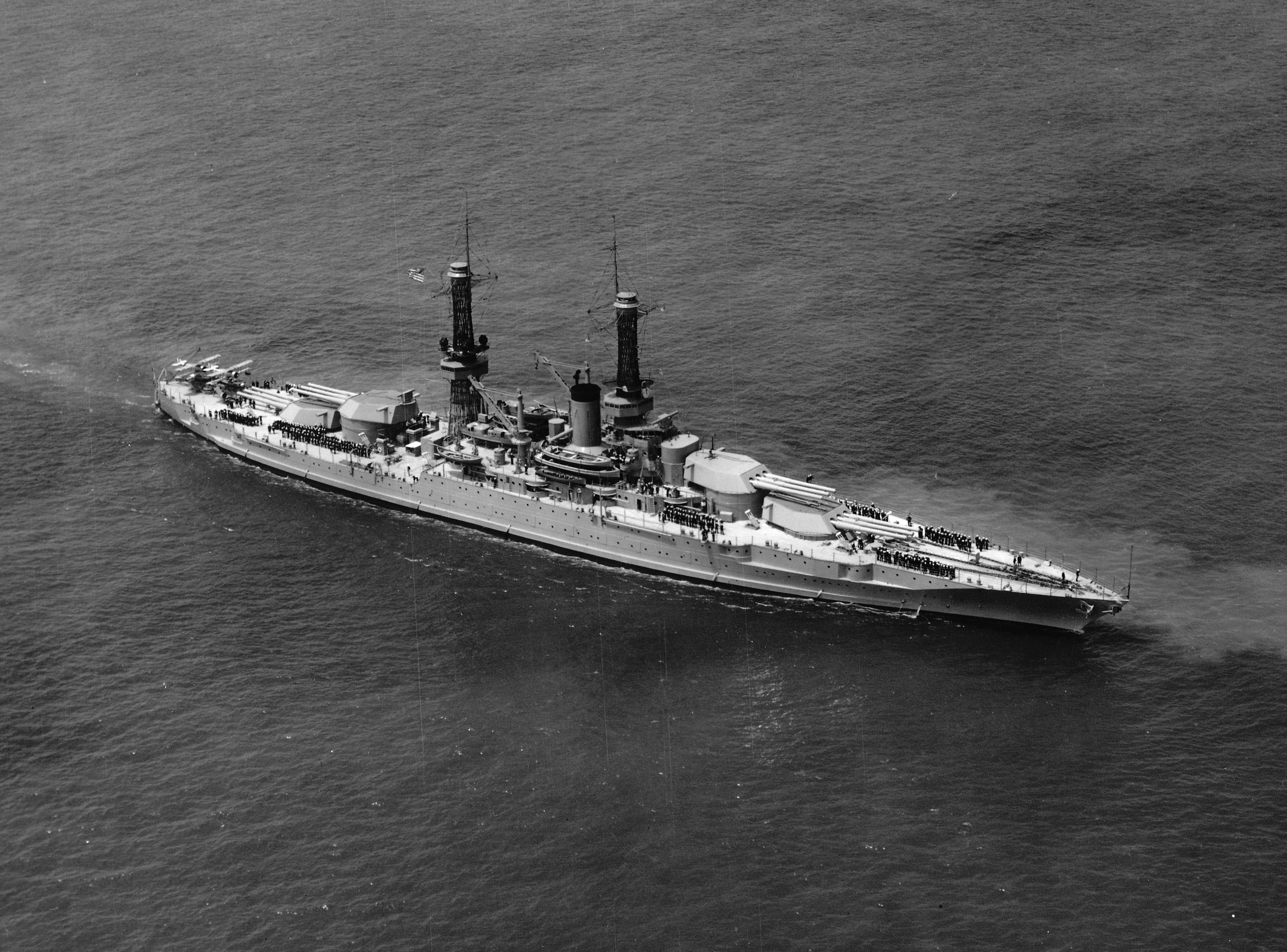
Idaho during a naval review in 1927

The ships of the New Mexico class were part of the standard series that began with the Nevada class; they featured similar characteristics, including speed, armor, armament, and the use of fuel oil rather than coal. They were designed as such to create a battle fleet of tactically homogeneous ships that would simplify command and control. They were 600 feet (180 m) long at the waterline and 624 ft (190 m) long overall. They had a beam of 97 ft 4.5 in (29.7 m) and a draft of 30 ft (9.1 m). They displaced 32,000 long tons (32,514 t) as designed and up to 33,000 long tons (33,530 t) at full combat load. Their hulls featured a long forecastle deck that stepped down to main deck level at the main mast. As built, the ships were fitted with two cage masts with spotting tops for the main-gun battery.

Their crew numbered 58 officers and 1,026 enlisted men. Over the course of their careers, their crews expanded significantly as equipment was added. After their early 1930s refit, their crew numbered 82 officers and 1,371 enlisted, and by 1945, wartime improvements brought the crews to 129 officers and 1,850 enlisted. They carried a number of smaller boats for utility purposes while in harbor, as well as to assist with rescue efforts at sea. These included a number of motor launches of various lengths and motor whaleboats.

All three ships were powered by four Curtis turbines, with steam provided by nine oil-fired Babcock & Wilcox boilers. New Mexico's turbines were used to power electrical motors that drove the screw propellers; her system was rated for 27,500 shaft horsepower (20,500 kW). The latter two ships, used reduction geared cruising turbines, which could be clutched into the high-pressure turbines to improve fuel economy at low speeds. These were rated at 32,000 shp (24,000 kW). All three vessels were rated for a top speed of 21 knots (39 km/h; 24 mph). Though the turbo-electric system was effective and it was repeated in the two following classes, the Navy ultimately decided that the system was too heavy and occupied too much space in the hull, and later ships reverted to traditional turbine propulsion.

The ships had storage capacity for 1,467 long tons (1,491 t) of fuel oil for the boilers, though additional spaces in the hull could be used to increase capacity to 2,200 long tons (2,200 t), which provided a cruising range of 8,000 nautical miles (15,000 km; 9,200 mi) at a speed of 10 kn (19 km/h; 12 mph). As speed increased, their range decreased significantly: at 12 knots (22 km/h; 14 mph), they could steam for 6,400 nmi (11,900 km; 7,400 mi), and at 20 kn (37 km/h; 23 mph), their range fell to 2,414 nmi (4,471 km; 2,778 mi). Moreover, these figures were assuming the vessels had clean hulls free of marine growth that would inhibit their hydrodynamic efficiency. In service conditions where biofouling added drag to the hulls, their ranges were reduced even further to 5,129 nmi (9,499 km; 5,902 mi) and 1,931 nmi (3,576 km; 2,222 mi), respectively.

=== Armament ===
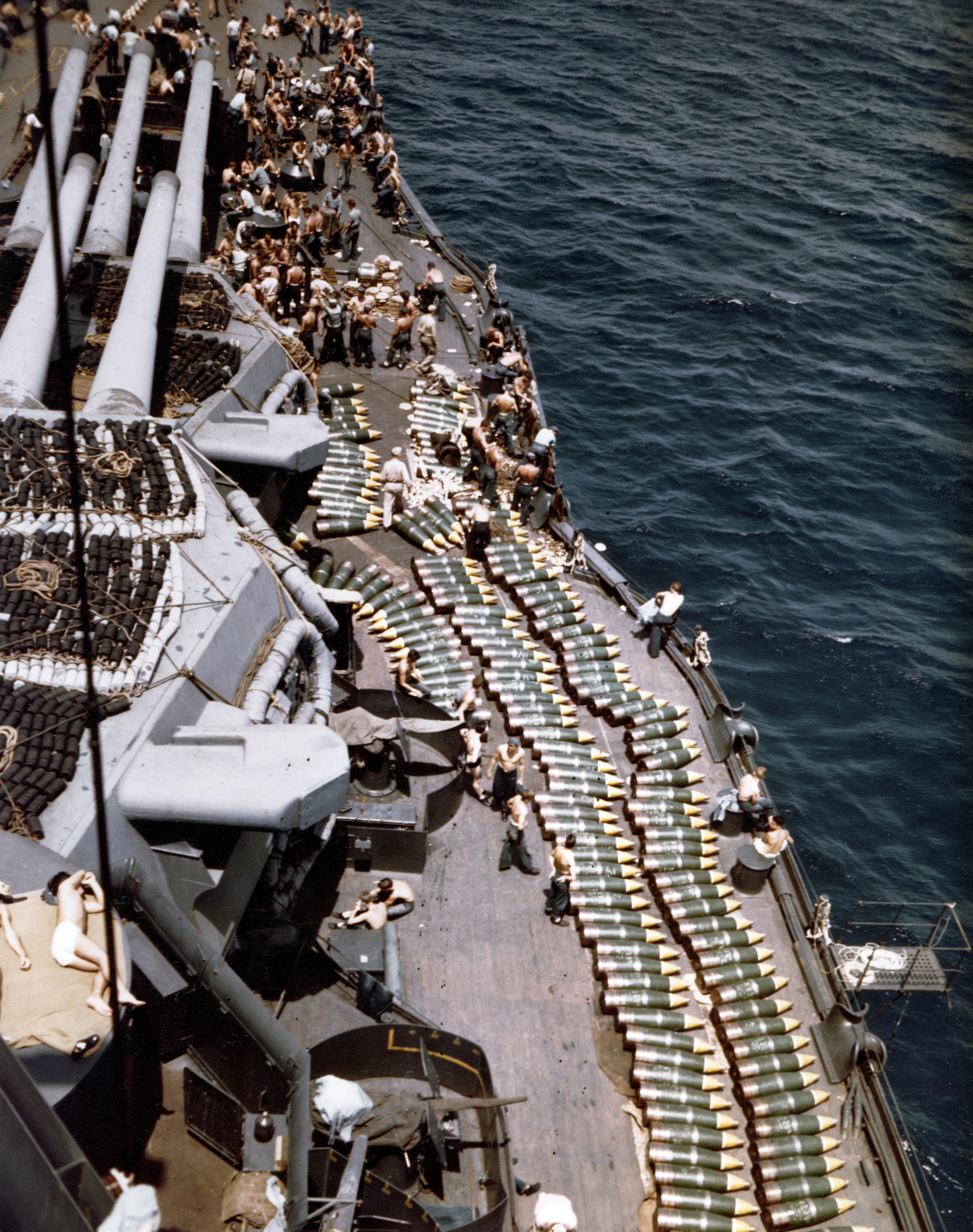
Crewmen loading 14-inch shells aboard New Mexico before the Battle of Guam

The ships were armed with a main battery of twelve 14-inch (356 mm)/50 caliber Mark IV guns in four, three-gun turrets on the centerline, placed in two superfiring pairs forward and aft of the superstructure. Unlike earlier American battleships with triple turrets, these mounts were true three-gun turrets, in that each barrel could elevate independently. They fired a 1,400 lb (640 kg) shell with a 470 lb (210 kg) bursting charge. The guns had a muzzle velocity of 2,800 ft/s (850 m/s). Early in their careers, the New Mexicos and the Tennessee class experienced excessive dispersion of shot. After extensive testing, it was eventually discovered to have been caused by overly lengthy chambers, which allowed a gap between the shell and the propellant charges. The problem was eventually corrected with the Mark VII gun. The guns were supplied with 100 shells each and they were capable of a rate of fire of about one salvo per minute, as demonstrated by extensive testing with Idaho in October 1942.

The secondary battery consisted of fourteen 5-inch (127 mm)/51 caliber guns mounted in individual casemates clustered in the superstructure amidships. Initially, the ship was to have been fitted with twenty-two of the guns, but experiences in the North Sea during World War I demonstrated that the additional guns, which would have been placed in the hull, would have been unusable in anything but calm seas. As a result, the casemates were plated over to prevent flooding, leaving only the fourteen guns in the superstructure. Of these, ten were located on the forecastle deck and the other four were in open mounts on the shelter deck. Each gun position contained twenty-four rounds of ready-use ammunition, with further munitions stored in the magazines below. The guns were the Mark VIII type, which had a muzzle velocity of 3,150 ft/s (960 m/s) firing a 50 lb (23 kg) shell.

The secondary battery was augmented with four 3-inch (76 mm)/50 caliber guns in high-angle mounts for anti-aircraft defense. The guns fired a 13 lb (5.9 kg) shell at a velocity of 2,700 ft/s (820 m/s).

In addition to their gun armament, the New Mexico-class ships were also fitted with two 21-inch (533 mm) torpedo tubes, mounted submerged in the hull, one on each broadside. Both tubes were located in a single torpedo room forward in the hull. Each tube was supplied with a total of six torpedoes, which were Bliss-Leavitt weapons of the Mark VII type; these carried a 321 lb (146 kg) warhead and had a range of 12,500 yd (11,400 m) at a speed of 27 kn (50 km/h; 31 mph).

=== Armor ===
As was standard for American battleships of the period, the New Mexico-class ships relied on the "all or nothing" principle that reserved armor protection only for a ship's vitals, creating an armored citadel that had enough reserve buoyancy to keep the vessel afloat even if the unarmored portions of the ship were flooded. The main armored belt was 8–13.5 in (203–343 mm) thick, with the thickest armor protecting the ammunition magazines and the propulsion machinery spaces. The transverse bulkheads that capped either end of the belt were the same thickness. The ships had two armored decks; the first, consisted of two layers of special treatment steel (STS) that were 1.75 in (44 mm) thick. Further aft, these were increased to a 1.75 in layer and a 4.5 in (114 mm) layer over the steering compartment. The lower armored deck also consisted of two layers, which were also composed of STS, the first 1 in (25 mm) thick and the second 2 in thick.

The main battery gun turrets had 18 in (457 mm) thick faces, with 10 in (254 mm) thick sides, 9 in (229 mm) rears, and 5 in roofs. They rested on 13 in (330 mm) barbettes that reduced to 4.5 in below the upper deck, where it was protected by the armored citadel. The conning tower had 16 in thick sides and a roof that consisted of two layers that were each 4 in (102 mm) thick.

=== Modifications ===
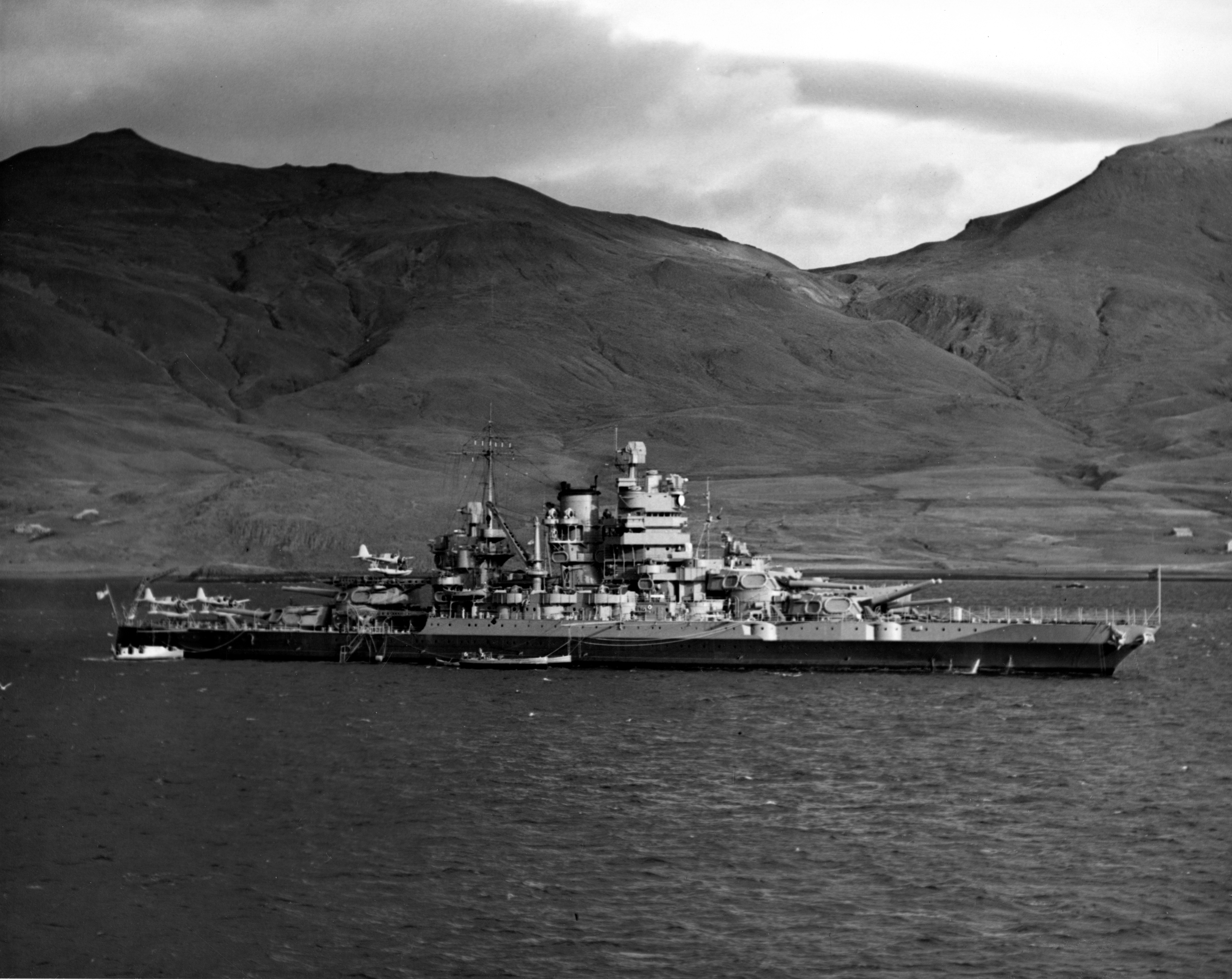
Idaho off Iceland in 1942, showing her post-1934-refit configuration

The members of the New Mexico class received a series of modifications even while under construction, including the already noted alterations to the secondary battery, which was authorized on 7 February 1918 by which time New Mexico had been completed with her original twenty-two guns. The other two ships had already had their casemates built into their hulls, so they were simply plated over, unlike the later Tennessees, which had their hulls faired in. Their conning towers were modified with a newly developed bridge arrangement that became standard for all American battleships of the period. It consisted of a fully enclosed navigation bridge on the forward side of the tower, with a large chart house located behind the bridge. Atop the structure was an enclosed torpedo defense station. Starting in 1921, the Navy began installing aircraft catapults on its battleships to allow them to operate floatplanes for aerial reconnaissance and fire observation, and the three New Mexicos were among the vessels to receive a Mark II catapult. The ships initially carried Hanriot HD.2 and then Vought UO-1s in the 1920s, which were replaced with Vought O2U Corsairs toward the end of the decade. These, and improved O3U variants served aboard the ships until 1938, when these were replaced with Curtiss SOC Seagulls. Beginning in August 1940, the ships began to receive Vought OS2U Kingfishers.

The three ships were heavily modernized in the early 1930s. Their received an additional 2 in of special treatment steel for their main deck armor, bringing the total thickness to 5.5 in (140 mm). A second torpedo bulkhead was installed outboard of the original one, and all three ships received anti-torpedo bulges to further enhance their resistance to underwater attack. Both lattice masts were removed; a heavy tower bridge was built in place of the fore mast, and a light pole mast was erected in place of the main mast. During the installation of her new bridge, Idaho was fitted out as a flagship, which included the addition of a flag bridge for the admiral and his staff. The ships' armament was also revised, with the main battery turrets being modified to allow elevation to 30 degrees, greatly extending the range of the guns. Two of the 5-inch guns were removed, and eight 5-inch/25 caliber anti-aircraft guns were installed. These alterations greatly increased their displacement, to 33,420 long tons (33,960 t) standard and 36,157 long tons (36,737 t) full load. All three ships had their propulsion systems overhauled, receiving new Westinghouse turbines and six BuEng express boilers. Despite the increases in displacement resulting from the additional armor plating and the bulges, the new powerplant increased speed to 22 knots (41 km/h; 25 mph) from 40,000 shaft horsepower (30,000 kW). The ships' crews increased significantly, to 1,443.

Immediately after the Japanese attack on Pearl Harbor on 7 December 1941 (while the New Mexico-class ships were in the Atlantic), the ships were docked for improvements to their anti-aircraft armament, receiving a battery of 1.1 in (28 mm) anti-aircraft guns. The ships also had Mark 3 fire-control radars installed. The Navy considered removing their heavily armored conning towers to compensate for the increased weight of the new equipment, but the work could not be accomplished in the eight-week overhaul period that had been scheduled, so they retained their original towers, unlike many of the other older battleships that were rebuilt early in the war. Since many of the American battleships had been sunk or damaged at Pearl Harbor, the three New Mexicos were too valuable to be removed from operational status for the necessary amount of time to substantially rebuild them. As a result of these limitations, New Mexico and Mississippi received a series of rolling changes over the course of late 1942 and into 1943; while at Pearl Harbor in October 1942, they had four of their 5-inch /51 guns removed, along with their directors, to free up space for a pair of quadruple Bofors 40 mm (1.6 in) guns and the shielded tubs for the 1.1-inch guns were converted for use with the 40 mm mounts, though the 1.1-inch guns remained until 1943. Six 20 mm (0.79 in) Oerlikon guns were added as well.

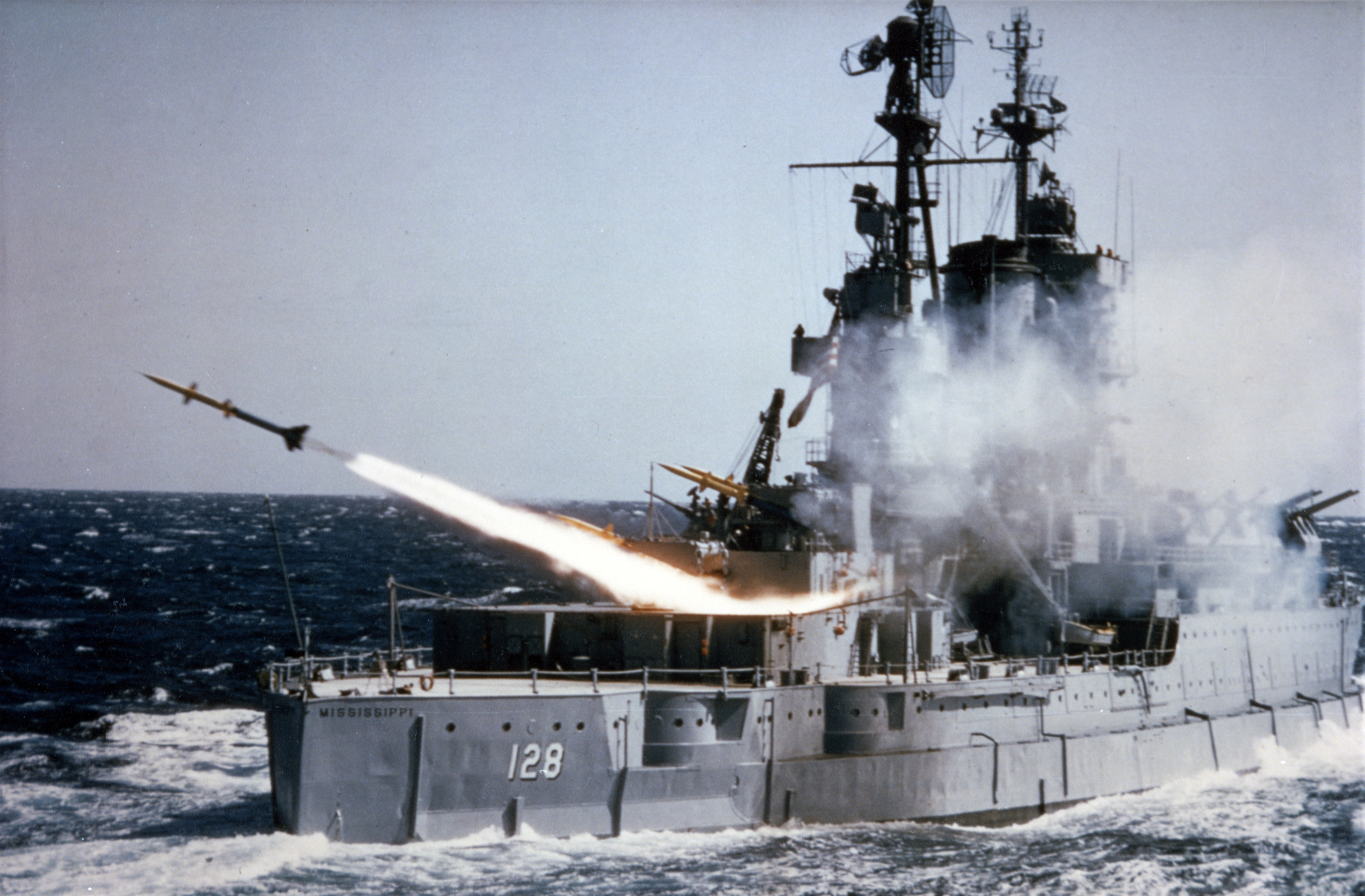
Mississippi launching a RIM-2 Terrier missile

During a refit from 14 October to 28 December 1942, while her sisters received only modest alterations, Idaho underwent a more thorough modernization. This consisted of a new anti-aircraft battery of ten quadruple Bofors guns and forty-three Oerlikons, though the Oerlikons were added in stages. By the time the refit ended, she carried only sixteen of them, with eleven more added in January 1943, the remaining sixteen being added in February. The Mark 3 radars were replaced in 1944 by Mark 8 radars aboard Idaho, with New Mexico and Mississippi receiving Mark 28 radars for their light AA armament. Later that year, the ships began to receive Mark 27 backup fire-control radars as well.

From 22 October 1944 to 1 January 1945, Idaho received another major refit, which included the installation of ten 5-inch/38 caliber guns in individual, dual-purpose mounts in place of the old 25-caliber guns. She also received new Mark 8 radars for her main battery fire control system. In early 1945, while under repair for combat damage, Mississippi also received a new secondary battery. The old 51-caliber 5-inch guns were removed, and eight more of the 25-caliber anti-aircraft guns were installed, along with twelve quadruple Bofors 40 mm mounts and thirty-four 20 mm Oerlikon guns in twin mounts. To compensate for the added weight, the ship's armored conning tower was removed.

In 1946, Mississippi was converted into a gunnery training ship, and for this role she received a new gun battery. No. 1 turret was replaced by a twin 6-inch (152 mm)/47 caliber dual-purpose turret, the same as mounted on the Worcester class anti-aircraft cruisers. No. 2 and No. 3 main battery turrets were also removed, but No. 4 turret was initially retained. Three twin 5-inch /38 caliber dual-purpose mounts, two single 5-inch/54 caliber dual-purpose mounts (as on the Midway class aircraft carriers), two twin 3-inch (76 mm)/50 caliber mounts, and two 40 mm Bofors quad mounts were installed. In 1952, the last main battery turret was removed and Mississippi had two new RIM-2 Terrier missile launchers installed in its place. She later tested the Petrel missile, a radar-homing weapon, in February 1956.

== Ships in class ==
Construction data
Ship name	Hull no.	Builder	Laid down	Launched	Commissioned	Decommissioned	Fate
New Mexico	BB-40	Brooklyn Navy Yard, New York City	14 October 1915	13 April 1917	20 May 1918	19 July 1946	Struck 25 February 1947; Broken up at Newark, 1947
Mississippi	BB-41	Newport News Shipbuilding, Newport News	5 April 1915	25 January 1917	18 December 1917	17 September 1956	Struck 17 September 1956; Broken up at Baltimore, 1956
Idaho	BB-42	New York Shipbuilding Corporation, Camden	20 January 1915	30 June 1917	24 March 1919	3 July 1946	Broken up at Newark, 1947

== Service history ==
=== Pre-war careers ===
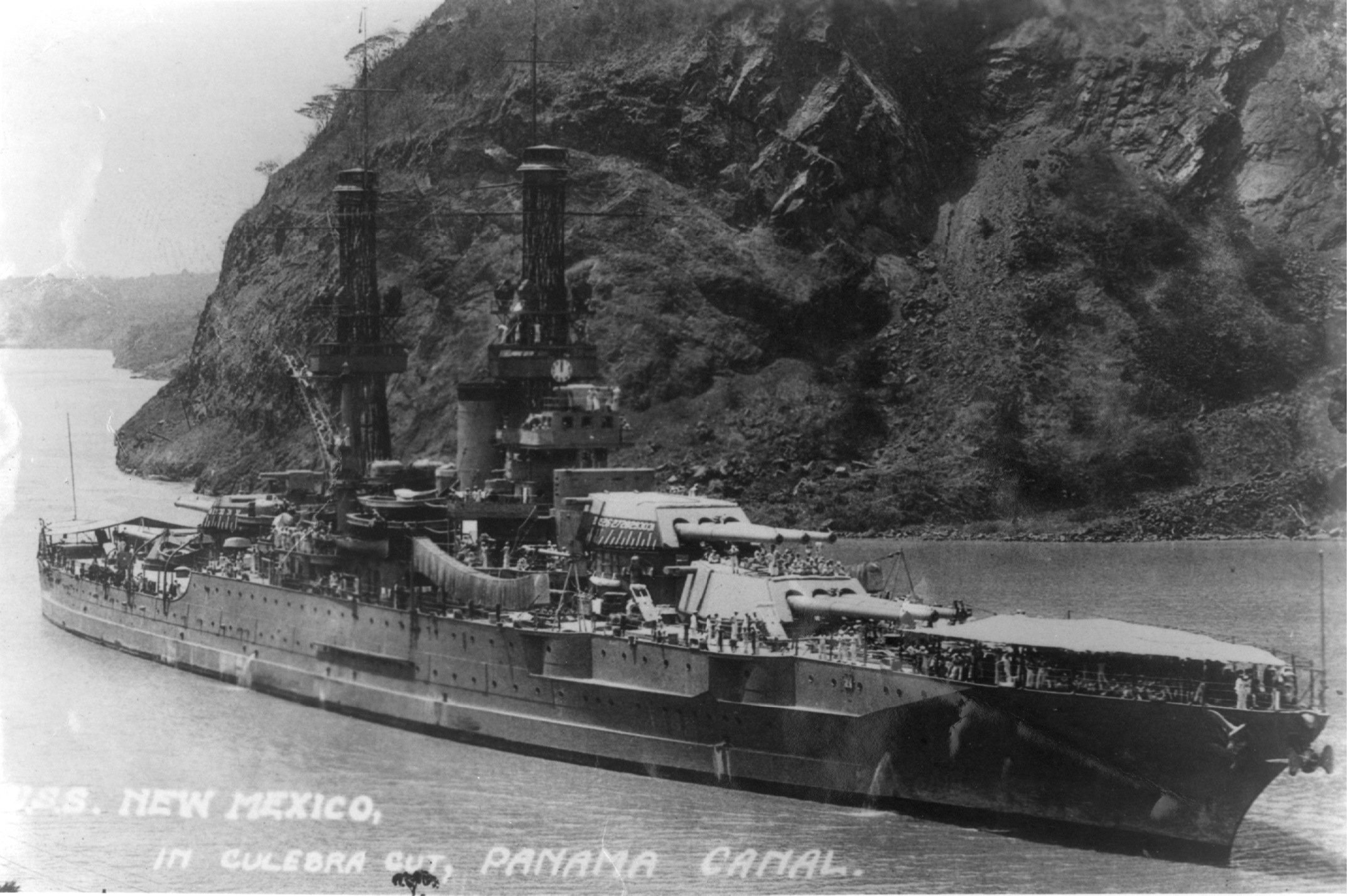
New Mexico passing through the Panama Canal

As the members of the class entered service, they initially operated in the Atlantic, and New Mexico escorted President Woodrow Wilson across the Atlantic to the Versailles Peace Conference that ended World War I. As the US Navy reorganized its fleet to emphasize a focus on affairs in Asia and the Pacific, the ships were reassigned to the Pacific Fleet in 1919, with New Mexico serving as the fleet flagship. Throughout this period, the fleet was based in San Pedro, California, but it frequently operated in Hawaiian waters, off the coast of Central and South America, and in the Caribbean Sea. In 1925, the Pacific Fleet embarked on a major cruise to visit Australia and New Zealand.

Beginning in 1923, the US Navy began a series of major exercises with Fleet Problem I, during which Mississippi sank the old battleship Iowa, which had by then been converted into a target ship; Mississippi used aircraft to spot her shots at long range, the first time this had been done in the US Navy. The fleet problems were typically held once a year, and they provided the basis for the US Navy's operations in the Pacific War. Experience in the exercises that demonstrated that the standard type battleships were too slow to operate with aircraft carriers led to the development of the fast battleships built in the 1930s. Joint training with the Marine Corps provided experience that proved to be useful during the island-hopping campaign during the Pacific War. In 1937, the ships took part in training exercises in Dutch Harbor, Alaska, to experiment with sub-arctic operations.

In mid-1940, the Battle Fleet was transferred from California to Hawaii in response to rising tensions between the United States and Japan over the latter's aggression in the Second Sino-Japanese War. By 1941, President Franklin D. Roosevelt initiated the Neutrality Patrols to protect American shipping caught in the Battle of the Atlantic during World War II. All three New-Mexico-class ships were transferred from the Pacific to the Atlantic Fleet to reinforce the patrols in May that year. During this period, the ships escorted convoys between the United States and Iceland, though they saw no action with German U-boats that were waging an unrestricted submarine warfare campaign against merchant shipping in the North Atlantic.

=== World War II ===
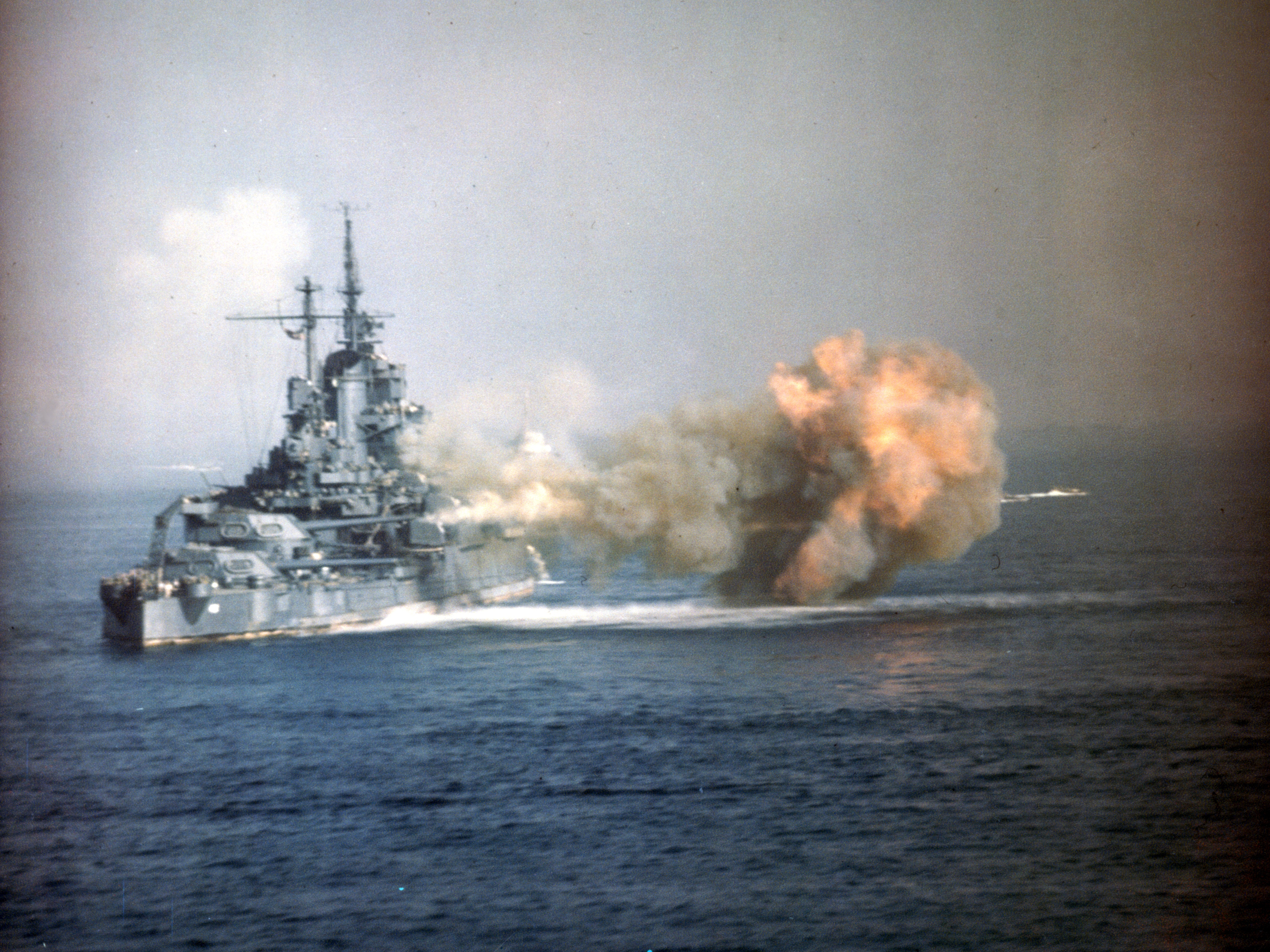
Idaho shelling Okinawa on 1 April 1945

Immediately after the Japanese attack on Pearl Harbor, the Navy reassigned the three battleships to the Pacific Fleet to shore up the fleet's battleship strength. After arriving in California in January 1942, the ships spent the next several months patrolling the west coast of the United States and escorting convoys in the area. They took part in the Aleutian Islands campaign between May and July 1943, with Idaho serving as the flagship of the bombardment group that shelled the islands of Attu and Kiska. After maintenance and training at Pearl Harbor, the three New Mexicos then took part in the Gilbert and Marshall Islands campaign that began in November, where they provided naval gunfire support to the Marines who stormed ashore at Tarawa, Kwajalein, and Eniwetok, among other islands in the archipelago. These operations continued into January 1944, at which point the fleet began preparations for the next major campaign, which would be directed against the Marianas Islands in the central Pacific.

New Mexico and Idaho took part in the Mariana and Palau Islands campaign beginning in June 1944, though Mississippi was out of service for a refit during the first part of the campaign. They shelled Japanese positions on Saipan, Tinian, and Guam as amphibious forces assaulted each island in turn. The two battleships remained with the invasion fleet to cover it from Japanese attacks while the Fast Carrier Task Force met and decisively defeated the Japanese 1st Air Fleet in the Battle of the Philippine Sea. By September, Mississippi had returned to the fleet to relieve New Mexico for her own refit, and she and Idaho shelled the island of Pelelieu, the last battle of the Marianas campaign. The fleet thereafter withdrew to Manus Island to prepare for the coming invasion of the Philippines, while New Mexico departed for a refit at the Puget Sound Navy Yard.

Mississippi supported the invasion of Leyte in October as part of the bombardment group under Rear Admiral Jesse B. Oldendorf. The American invasion triggered the Japanese to launch Operation Shō-Gō 1, a major naval counterattack that resulted in the Battle of Leyte Gulf on 23–26 October, a complex battle that involved four separate actions. She was present at the Battle of Surigao Strait on the night of 24 October, which was one component of the battle. There, the Allied fleet destroyed the Japanese Southern Force consisting of a pair of old battleships, one heavy cruiser, and four destroyers; only one Japanese destroyer escaped the overwhelming Allied fleet. Mississippi, which still had her old Mark 3 radars, had difficulty in finding a target in the darkness and fired only one salvo in the last battleship action in history.

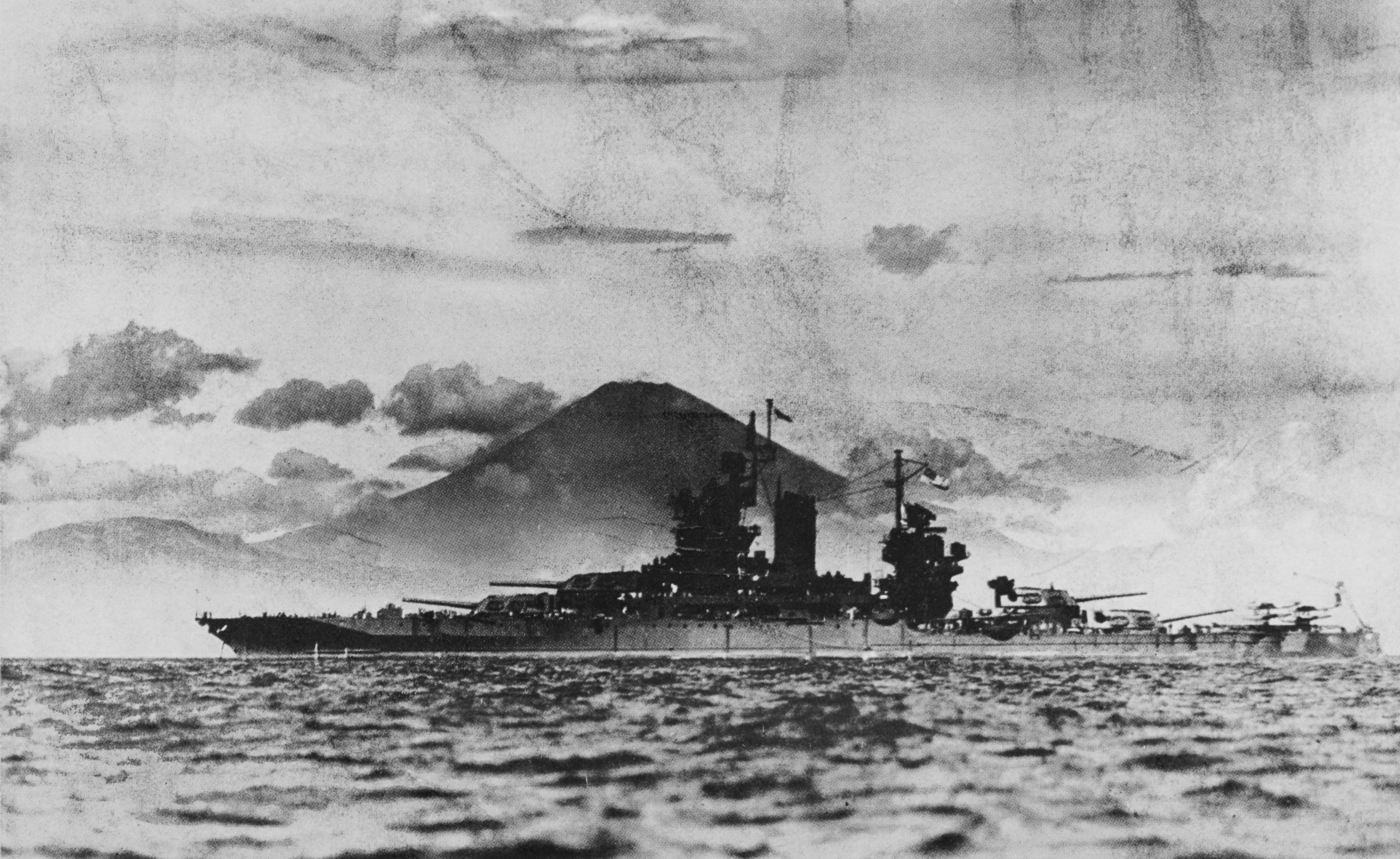
New Mexico anchored in Tokyo Bay, with Mount Fuji in the background

By January 1945, New Mexico had rejoined the fleet, the next target of which was the invasion of Lingayen Gulf on the island of Luzon; she and Mississippi supported the amphibious assault and during the battle both ships were struck by a kamikaze suicide plane. The two ships nevertheless remained in action until February when they departed for Pearl Harbor for repairs. By that time, Idaho had completed her refit and had rejoined the fleet in time to take part in the Battle of Iwo Jima. She shelled the island extensively before the Marines went ashore and continued to provide fire support during the battle. Repairs to New Mexico and Mississippi were completed quickly, and all three sister ships were reunited to support the invasion of Okinawa in May 1945. As Japan's military situation continued to deteriorate, they launched increasingly desperate kamikaze attacks. New Mexico and Mississippi were both hit by another kamikaze and Idaho was damaged by a near miss. New Mexico was also hit by a bomb, forcing her to withdraw for repairs. All three ships were repaired in time to participate in the initial occupation of Japan in August and September.

=== Postwar ===
New Mexico and Idaho returned to the east coast of the United States by October 1945, where they were both decommissioned. Initially slated to be kept in the reserve fleet, they were instead stricken from the naval register in 1947 and sold for scrap. Mississippi survived the postwar draw-down in naval strength through conversion into a gunnery training and evaluation ship to replace the older battleship Wyoming. With the new hull number EAG-128 to designate her status as an auxiliary vessel, she was reconstructed at the Norfolk Naval Shipyard from November 1945 through April 1948 with a new armament that included a variety of different weapons, thereafter serving as the flagship of the Operational Test and Evaluation Force. She helped to evaluate anti-aircraft missiles in the mid-1950s before being decommissioned in February 1956 and sold to ship breakers. By that time, she had spent nearly 39 years in service.
