= USS New Mexico (BB-40) =

Dreadnought battleship of the United States Navy

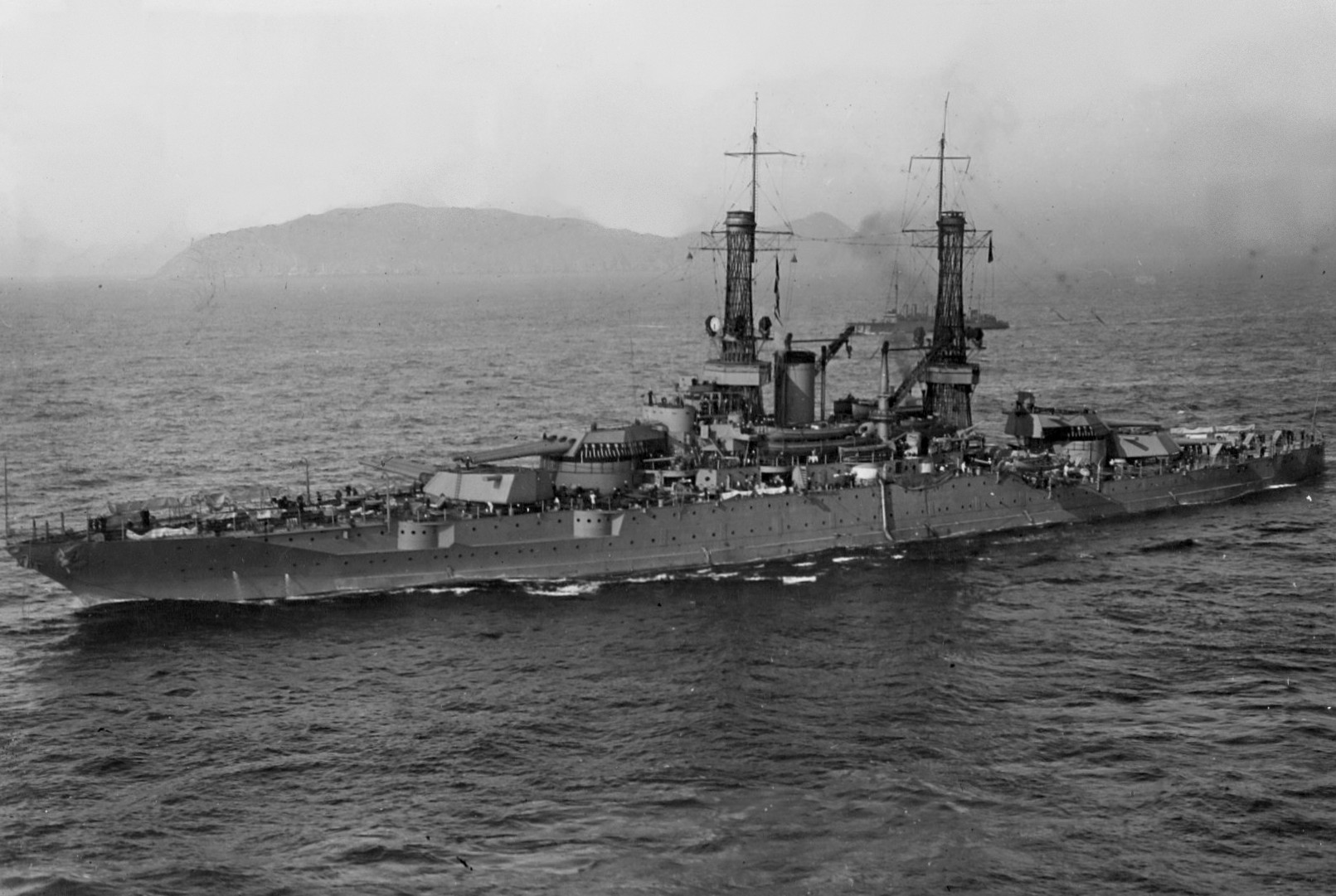
- USS New Mexico (BB-40) in 1921

History

United States
- Name: New Mexico
- Namesake: New Mexico
- Builder: Brooklyn Navy Yard
- Laid down: 14 October 1915
- Launched: 13 April 1917
- Commissioned: 20 May 1918
- Decommissioned: 19 July 1946
- Stricken: 25 February 1947
- Honors and awards: 6 × battle stars, World War II
- Fate: Scrapped 1948

General characteristics
- Class & type: New Mexico-class battleship
- Displacement: Normal: 32,000 long tons (32,514 t); Full load: 33,000 long tons (33,530 t)
- Length: 624 ft (190 m)
- Beam: 97 ft 5 in (29.69 m)
- Draft: 30 ft (9.1 m)
- Installed power: 9 × Babcock & Wilcox boilers; 27,500 shp (20,500 kW)
- Propulsion: 4 × turbo-electric steam turbines; 4 × screw propellers
- Speed: 21 kn (24 mph; 39 km/h)
- Complement: 1,084 officers and men
- Armament: 12 × 14 in (356 mm)/50 cal guns; 14 × 5 in (127 mm)/51 cal guns; 8 × 3 in (76 mm)/50 cal guns; 2 × Mark 15 21 in (533 mm) torpedo tubes
- Armor: Belt: 8–13.5 in (203–343 mm); Barbettes: 13 in (330 mm); Turret face: 18 in (457 mm); Turret sides: 9–10 in (229–254 mm); Turret top: 5 in (127 mm); Turret rear 9 in (229 mm); Conning tower: 11.5 in (292 mm); Decks: 3.5 in (89 mm)

USS New Mexico, hull number BB-40, was a battleship in service with the United States Navy from 1918 to 1946. She was the lead ship of a class of three battleships, and the first ship to be named for the state of New Mexico. Her keel was laid down on 14 October 1915 at the New York Navy Yard, from which she was launched on 23 April 1917 and commissioned on 20 May 1918. New Mexico was the U.S. Navy's most advanced warship and its first battleship with a turbo-electric transmission, which helped her reach a maximum speed of 21 knots (39 km/h; 24 mph).

Shortly after completing initial training, New Mexico escorted the ship that carried President Woodrow Wilson to Brest, France to sign the Treaty of Versailles. Thereafter she was made the first flagship of the newly created United States Pacific Fleet. The interwar period was marked by repeated exercises with the Pacific and Atlantic Fleets, use as a trial ship for PID controllers, and a major modernization between March 1931 and January 1933. New Mexico's first actions during World War II were neutrality patrols in the Atlantic Ocean. She returned to the Pacific after the Japanese attack on Pearl Harbor and participated in shore bombardments during operations at Attu and Kiska, Tarawa, the Marshall Islands, the Mariana and Palau islands, Leyte, Luzon, and Okinawa; these were interspersed with escort duties, patrols, and refits. The ship was attacked by kamikazes on several occasions. New Mexico was awarded six battle stars for her service in the Pacific campaign and was present in Tokyo Bay for Japan's formal surrender on 2 September 1945. Four days later, she sailed for the United States and arrived in Boston on 17 October.

New Mexico was decommissioned in Boston on 19 July 1946 and struck from the Naval Vessel Register on 25 February 1947. She was sold for scrapping to the Lipsett Division of Luria Bros in November 1947, but attempts to bring her to Newark, New Jersey for breaking up were met with resistance from city officials. City fireboats were sent to block the passage of the battleship and the Lipsett tugboats, while the United States Coast Guard declared intentions to guarantee safe passage. The Under Secretary of the Navy Department was sent to defuse what the media began to call the "Battle of Newark Bay"; the city agreed to break up New Mexico and two other battleships before scrapping operations in Newark Bay ceased, while Lipsett was instructed to dismantle the ships in a set timeframe or suffer financial penalties. Scrapping commenced in November and was completed by July 1948.

== Description ==
New Mexico was 624 feet (190 m) long overall and had a beam of 97 ft 5 in (29.69 m) and a draft of 30 ft (9.1 m). She displaced 32,000 long tons (32,514 t) as designed and up to 33,000 long tons (33,530 t) at full combat load. Unlike the other members of her class, New Mexico was powered by four-shaft General Electric steam turbines fitted with turbo-electric transmission and nine oil-fired Babcock & Wilcox boilers rated at 27,500 shaft horsepower (20,500 kW), generating a top speed of 21 knots (39 km/h; 24 mph). The ship had a cruising range of 8,000 nautical miles (15,000 km; 9,200 mi) at a speed of 10 kn (19 km/h; 12 mph). Her crew numbered 1,084 officers and enlisted men. As built, she was fitted with two lattice masts with spotting tops for the main gun battery. The main armored belt was 13.5 in (343 mm) thick, while the main armored deck was up to 3.5 in (89 mm) thick. The main battery gun turrets had 18 in (457 mm) thick faces on 13 in (330 mm) barbettes. The conning tower had 16 in (406 mm) thick sides.

The ship was armed with a main battery of twelve 14-inch (356 mm)/50 caliber guns in four, three-gun turrets on the centerline, placed in two superfiring pairs forward and aft of the superstructure. Unlike earlier American battleships with triple turrets, these mounts were true three-gun barrels, in that each barrel could elevate independently. The secondary battery consisted of fourteen 5-inch (127 mm)/51 caliber guns mounted in individual casemates clustered in the superstructure amidships. Initially, the ship was fitted with twenty-two of the guns, but experiences in the North Sea during World War I demonstrated that the additional guns, which were placed in the hull, would have been unusable in anything but calm seas. As a result, these guns were removed and the casemates were plated over to prevent flooding. The secondary battery was augmented with four 3-inch (76 mm)/50 caliber guns. In addition to her gun armament, New Mexico was also fitted with two 21-inch (530 mm) torpedo tubes, mounted submerged in the hull, one on each broadside.

== Service history ==
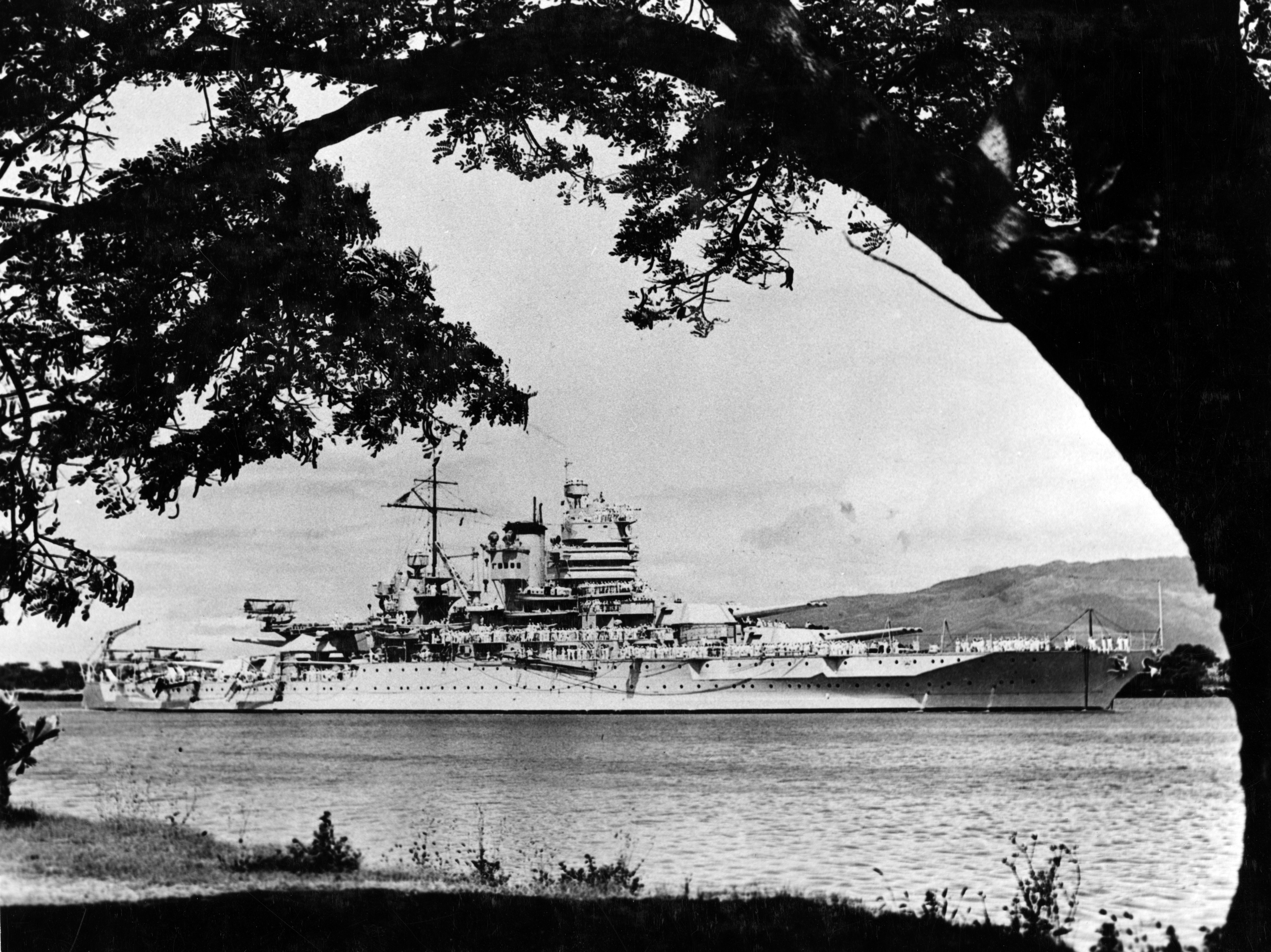
USS New Mexico (BB-40), c. 1935, in Pearl Harbor, Hawaii.

On 30 June 1914, New Mexico was authorized by the United States Congress. Initially, New Mexico was to have been named California, but she was renamed while under construction. Work on the new ship began on 14 October 1915, with her keel laying at the New York Navy Yard. She was launched on 13 April 1917, and commissioned into the fleet on 20 May 1918. Captain Ashley Herman Robertson was her first commanding officer. The ship thereafter began sea trials and a shakedown cruise before formally joining the Atlantic Fleet. In September, she was transferred to Boston. She was present during a naval review held on 26 December in New York City. She escorted the passenger ship George Washington as she carried President Woodrow Wilson to France for the Versailles Peace Conference, departing the United States on 15 January 1919. On 22 February, New Mexico encountered a foundering schooner; after taking off the sinking ship's crew, New Mexico's secondary battery used the vessel for target practice. On 27 February, the ship reached New York, and in mid-July, she had moved to Hampton Roads, Virginia. On 16 July, she became the flagship of the Pacific Fleet. Three days later, she left for California, passing through the Panama Canal and arriving in San Pedro on 9 August. Two of her 5-inch/51 caliber guns were removed in a later overhaul, in 1922.

The next twelve years consisted of training exercises and maneuvers in the Pacific and the Caribbean, with the Pacific and the Atlantic Fleets. She also took several cruises to South American ports and was used for the early development of PID controllers. Invented by the Russian-American engineer Nicolas Minorsky for the automated steering of ships, the devices have since become widespread in control engineering. After that, in 1925, she took a cruise to Australia and New Zealand.

After her training exercises in the Atlantic and the Pacific were finished, New Mexico was overhauled and modernized from March 1931 to January 1933 at the Philadelphia Navy Yard. The overhaul included the replacement of her turbo-electric drive with more conventional geared turbines, which were made by Curtis. In addition, New Mexico received eight 5-inch/25 caliber anti-aircraft guns, replacing the four 3-inch/50 caliber guns that had been previously installed. After the overhaul, she returned the Pacific to continue training exercises and the development of tactical operations. New Mexico's performance during these exercises garnered numerous awards, particularly in gunnery, engineering, and battlefield efficiency; she subsequently became known as the "Queen" or "Queen of the Fleet" by her crew.

During the 1936 Fleet Problem XVII, she had a maximum speed of 21 knots (39 km/h; 24 mph), in line with most U.S. Standard-type battleship of that time, but only 1.5 knots (2.8 km/h; 1.7 mph) faster than Japan's slowest battleships. This led to the development of the faster North Carolina-class battleship and South Dakota-class battleship. In 1937, she arrived in Hawaii to sail to Dutch Harbor, Alaska, where she and several other ships were sent to help the Navy evaluate fighting in sub-arctic conditions.

=== World War II ===
==== 1940–43 ====
As the prospect of war grew, New Mexico was based at Pearl Harbor, Hawaii, from 6 December 1940 to 20 May 1941. She then left Pearl Harbor to join the Atlantic fleet at Norfolk on 16 June for neutrality patrol duty along the Atlantic coast. In the Atlantic, she served on three 7- to 14-day "shifts" following destroyers to escort convoys across the Atlantic. On 10 December, while headed to Hampton Roads (en route to the west coast after the Japanese attacked Pearl Harbor), she accidentally rammed and sank the U.S. freighter Oregon south of the Nantucket Lightship off Boston Harbor. The owner of Oregon sued the federal government for the loss of the ship, but the courts found New Mexico blameless in the collision. She managed to reach the Panama Canal by 17 January 1942.

During an overhaul in May 1942, at the Puget Sound Navy Yard, she had her remaining secondary battery of twelve 5-inch/51 guns reduced to either 8 or 6 to make space for more anti-aircraft guns. After the overhaul, which was completed on 1 August, she departed San Francisco to Hawaii to prepare for action. From 6 December to 22 March 1943, she escorted convoys and transports to the Fiji Islands. After that, she patrolled the southwestern Pacific, before returning to Pearl Harbor to get ready for the Aleutian Islands Campaign. After her training, on 17 May, she steamed to Adak, which would be her base for the attack on Attu. She later participated in the shelling of Kiska on 21 July, which preceded the Japanese evacuation of the island a week later.

After the Aleutian Islands Campaign, a refit was undertaken at the Puget Sound Navy Yard. On 25 October, New Mexico returned to Pearl Harbor to practice for the invasion of the Gilbert Islands. On 20 November, while the invasion was under way, she shelled Makin Atoll. During the fighting on the islands the ship was tasked with guarding transports at night when they retreated from the islands, providing anti-aircraft fire for the unloading of supplies and troops, and providing screening fire for the aircraft carriers. After U.S. troops captured the Gilbert Islands on 5 December, New Mexico returned to Pearl Harbor.

==== 1944 ====
New Mexico was part of the Marshall Islands invasion force on 12 January 1944. She shelled Kwajalein and Ebeye from 31 January to 1 February. Replenishing at Majuro, on 20 February the ship shelled Wotje, and then the following month also shelled New Ireland and Kavieng. After that, she sailed to the Solomon Islands to practice the attack on the Mariana Islands, stopping at Sydney, in Australia, on the way.

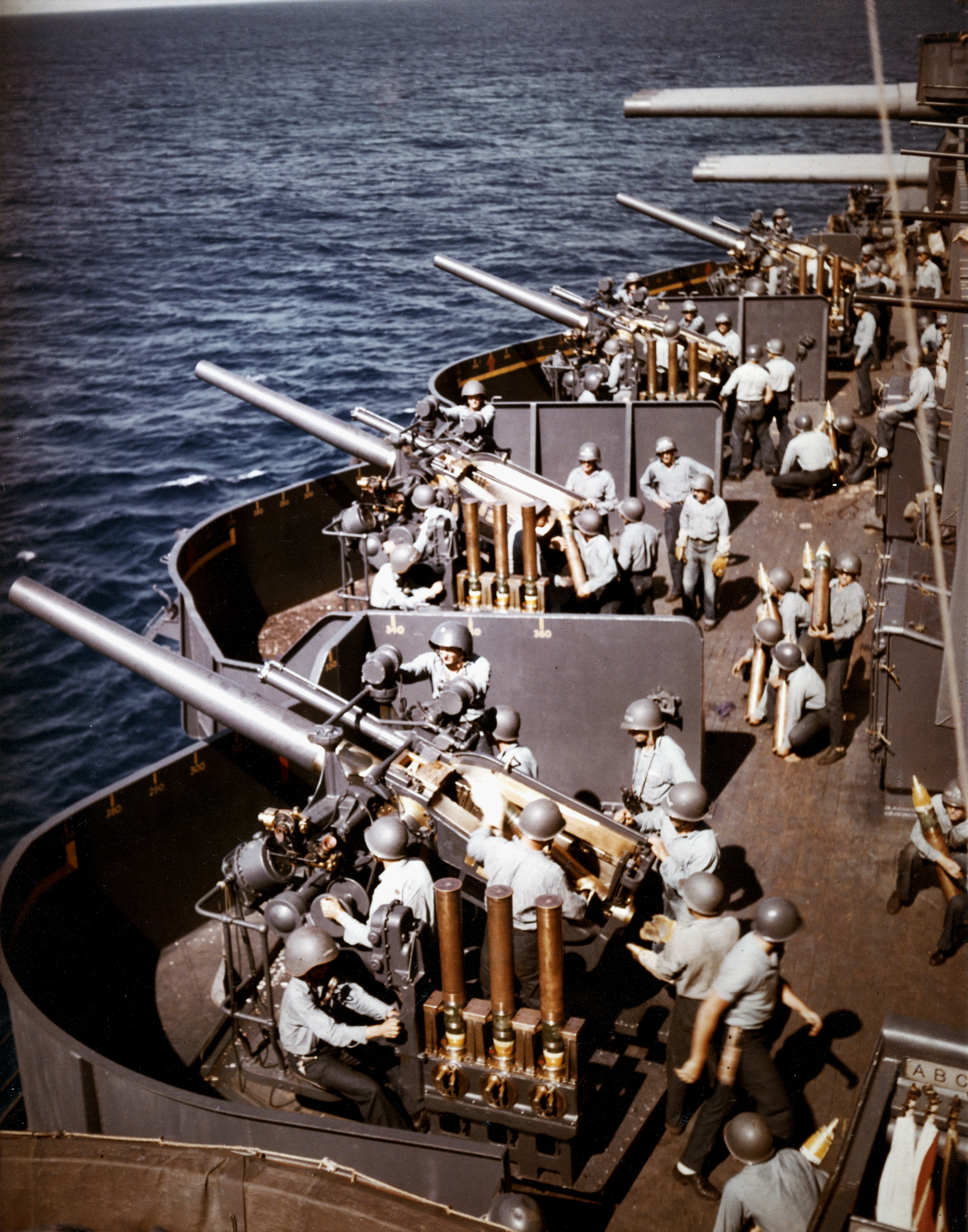
127mm gun battery aboard New Mexico off Saipan on 15 June 1944

In mid-June, New Mexico joined the shelling of Tinian, and also bombarded Saipan and Guam. On 18 June, she helped drive away two air attacks. Later, on 20 June, she escorted transports off the Mariana Islands. Meanwhile, the carrier task force destroyed the Japanese carrier force at the Battle of the Philippine Sea. Later, she escorted troop transports to the naval base of Eniwetok. On 9 July, she sailed to guard escort carriers until 12 July. Her guns later hit Guam on 21 July and kept on shelling the island until 30 July.

After the invasion of the Mariana Islands, she received an overhaul at Bremerton, Washington, from October to November. After the overhaul, she arrived in Leyte Gulf to escort reinforcement and supply transports and convoys. She dealt with daily air attacks, as the Japanese put up heavy resistance to the liberation of the Philippines. She departed Leyte Gulf on 2 December to the Palaus, where she later joined a Mindoro-bound convoy. She provided anti-aircraft fire for the convoy and provided cover fire for invading forces. She provided cover for two more days before retiring to the Palaus.

==== 1945 ====
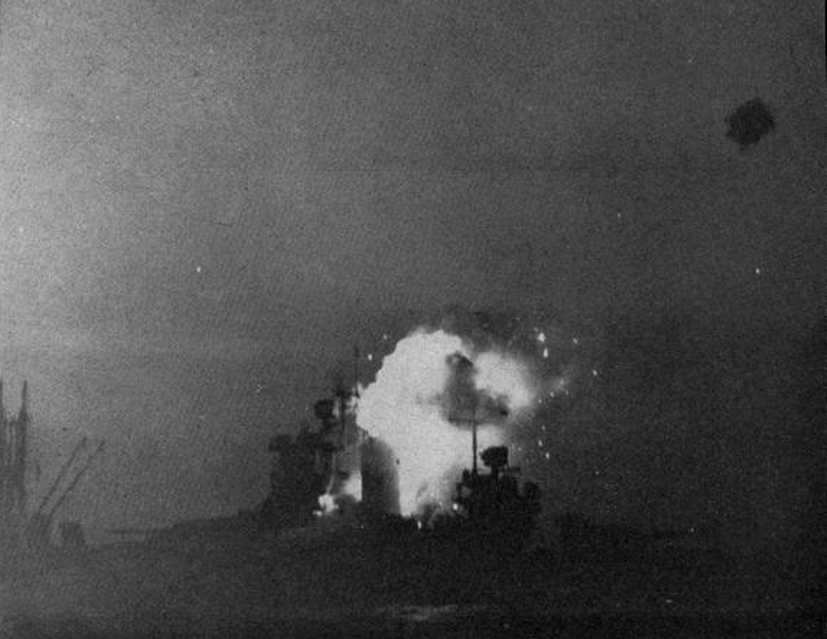
New Mexico is struck by a kamikaze aircraft, 12 May 1945

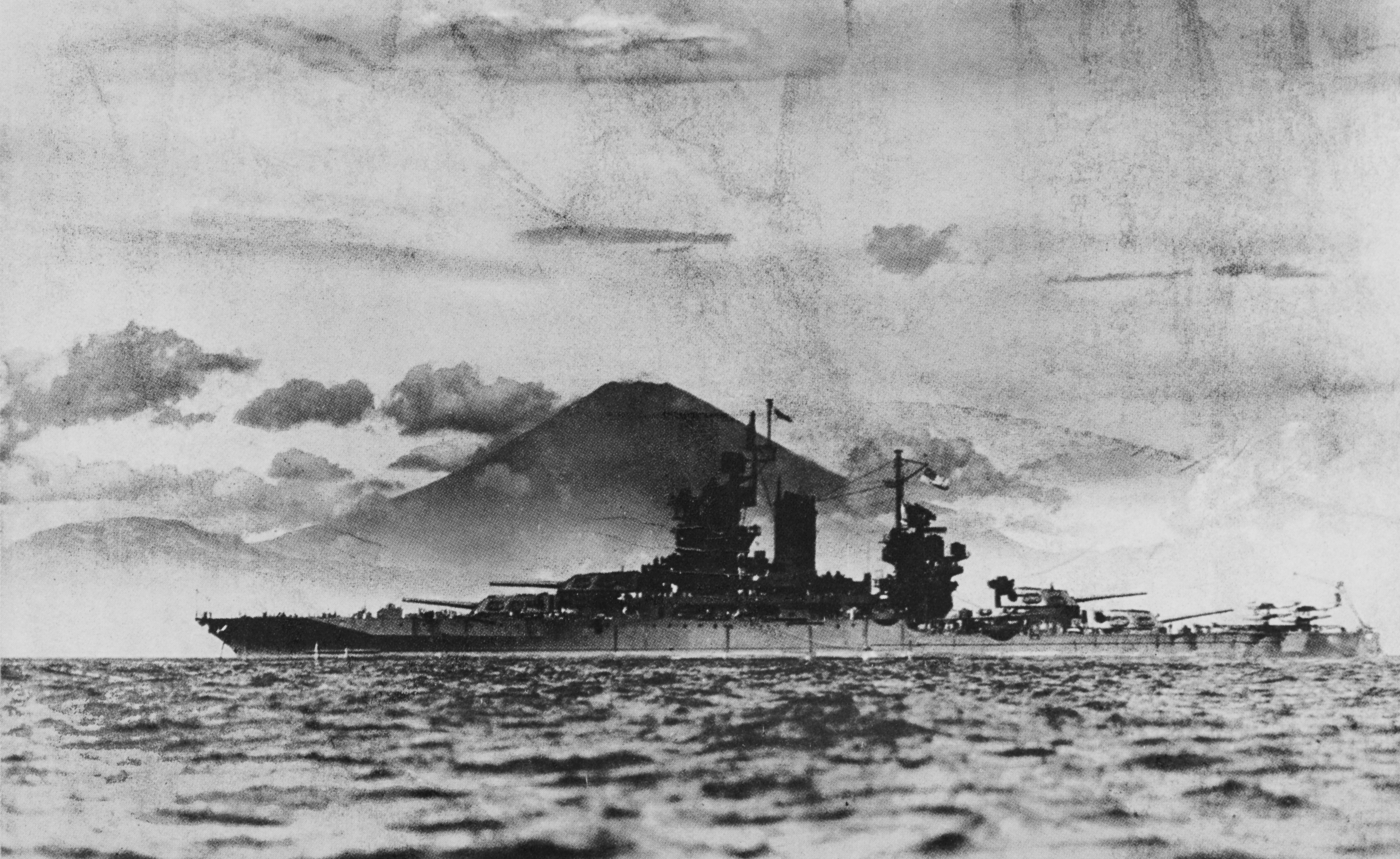
New Mexico, with Mt. Fuji in the background, August 1945.

New Mexico's next task in the Philippines was the liberation of Luzon. She took part in the pre-invasion shelling of Lingayen Gulf on 6 January. During the bombardment she came under heavy attack by kamikazes, one of which hit her bridge, killing her commanding officer, Captain Robert Walton Fleming, and 29 others. The dead included Lieutenant General Herbert Lumsden, the British representative to General of the Army Douglas MacArthur. Lumsden was the most senior British Army combat fatality of World War II. A further 87 of her crew were wounded. Bruce Fraser, the commander of the British Pacific Fleet, narrowly escaped death while on her bridge, although his secretary was killed. The guns remained in action as the ship's crew repaired the damage while the invasion troops were landing on the beaches.

More extensive repairs were completed at Pearl Harbor, after which New Mexico sailed to the island of Ulithi, where she was assigned to Task Force 54 (TF 54), the fire-support group for the invasion of Okinawa. Her heavy guns opened up on Okinawa on 26 March, and for the next month she continued to support the US troops ashore. On 11 May, she destroyed eight Shinyo suicide boats.

While she was approaching her berth in the Hagushi anchorage, just after sunset on 12 May, New Mexico was attacked by two kamikazes; one plunged into her, the other hit her with its bomb. She was set on fire and 54 crew members were killed, with a further 119 wounded. Swift action led to the fires being extinguished within 30 minutes. On 28 May, New Mexico departed for repairs at Leyte, followed by rehearsals for the planned invasion of Japan. News of the war's end reached her when she was at Saipan on 15 August; the next day she sailed for Okinawa to join the occupation force. She entered Sagami Wan on 27 August to support the airborne occupation of Atsugi Airfield. The next day New Mexico passed into Tokyo Bay to witness the Japanese surrender, which took place on 2 September. She departed Tokyo Bay on 6 September, passing Okinawa, Hawaii, and the Panama Canal, before arriving at Boston on 17 October.

=== Postwar ===
New Mexico was decommissioned in Boston on 19 July 1946 and was struck from the Naval Vessel Register on 25 February 1947. On 9 November 1947, she was sold for scrapping to the Lipsett Division of Luria Bros, for $381,600.

Lipsett decided to tow New Mexico for scrapping at Newark, New Jersey. The proximity of Newark to rail lines made it an ideal location for dismantling the ship and hauling away the steel. In early November 1947 New Mexico departed Boston, towed by two tugs. On 12 November, while off the coast of New York, the tugs pulling the battleship encountered heavy weather and were forced to cut the tow lines. Running lights were kept on aboard New Mexico along with three crewmembers, but the tugs eventually lost sight of the battleship. New Mexico then drifted as a derelict until spotted by a Coast Guard plane the next day, 35 miles off the coast. The two tugs then secured tow lines and continued the journey to the scrapyard.

Newark city officials decided they did not want any more ships scrapped along the city's waterfront. Newark was implementing a beautification plan for the waterfront, and had allocated $70 million for improvements. As such, the city declared that any attempt to bring New Mexico to Newark would be blocked. Two city fireboats, Michael P. Duffy and William T. Brennan, were dispatched and were prepared to use their fire hoses and chemical sprayers to halt Lipsett and New Mexico. In response, Lipsett organized its own force of four tugs, and the United States Coast Guard declared it would guarantee safe passage of New Mexico, provided legal entry was permitted. This showdown was dubbed by the press as the "Battle of Newark Bay", while the Santa Fe Chamber of Commerce announced it would protest Newark's "slur" of New Mexico's namesake, through its refusal to admit the battleship.

As New Mexico awaited suitable tidal conditions to make the final tow into Newark, the Navy Department sent Under Secretary W. John Kenney to negotiate. After several sessions, he arranged a tenuous agreement between the City of Newark and Lipsett. Newark would allow New Mexico and two other battleships, Idaho and Wyoming, to be scrapped at Newark, but there would be no permanent ship dismantling facility. Lipsett had nine months to dispose of the three ships, or would be subjected to a fine of $1,000 per day after the deadline.

New Mexico finally entered Newark Channel on 19 November, and was greeted by the same Newark fireboats that had earlier been sent to oppose the ship. Newark also arranged to have school children honor the old battleship dockside, with a marching band. New Mexico was subsequently joined by Idaho and Wyoming, where all three were finally dismantled. Scrapping of New Mexico began on 24 November and was completed by July 1948.

Two ship's bells from the battleship were donated to the state of New Mexico. The larger 1,100-pound (500 kg) bell was on display at the Santa Fe Plaza from 1948 until the early 1970s and is now part of the New Mexico History Museum collection. The smaller 800-pound (360 kg) bell was sent to the University of New Mexico, where it hung in Scholes Hall from 1948 to 1964 and subsequently in its own freestanding tower near Smith Plaza.
