= USS Idaho (BB-42) =

Dreadnought battleship of the United States Navy

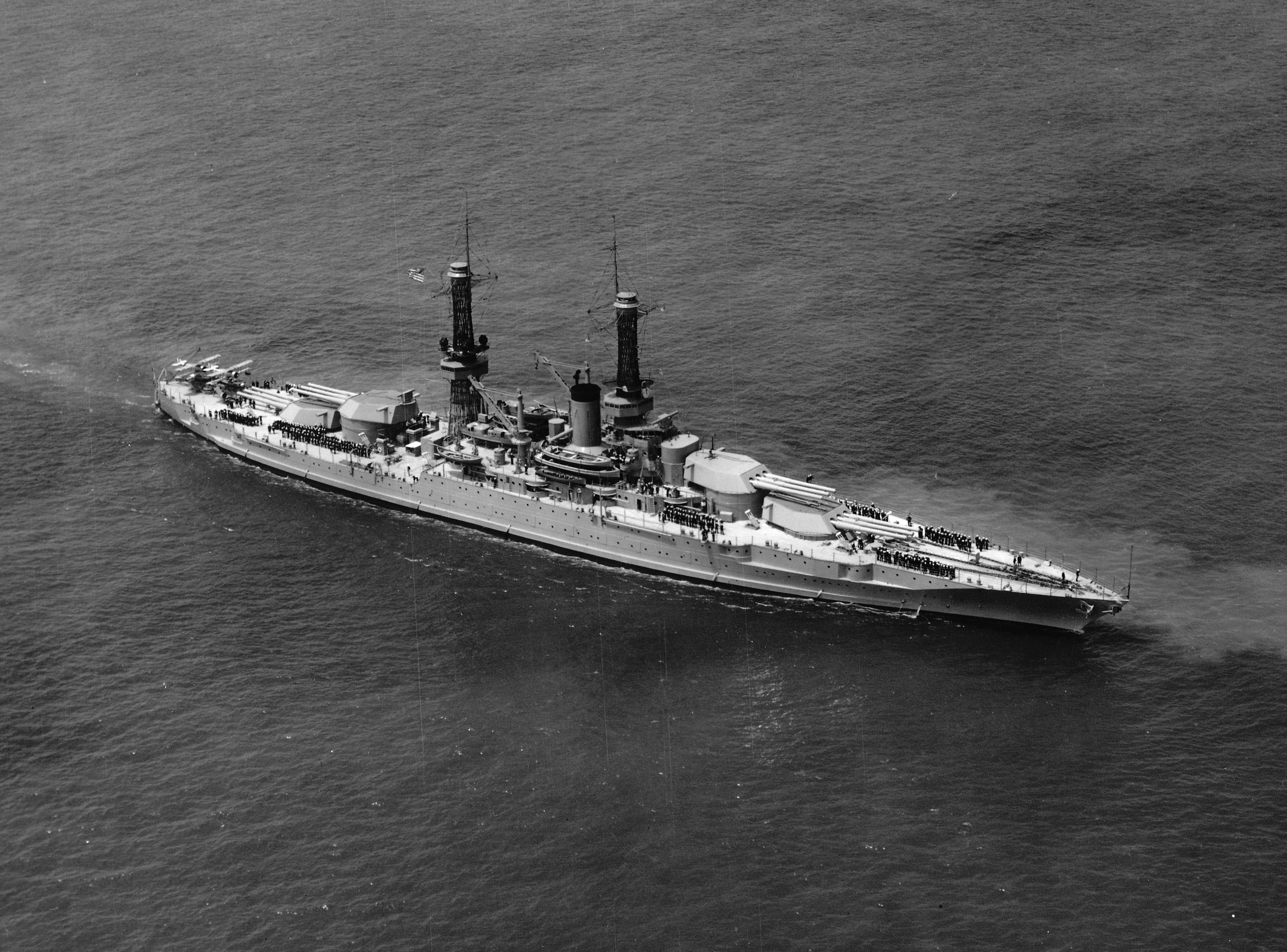
- USS Idaho (BB-42) in 1927

History

United States
- Name: Idaho
- Namesake: Idaho
- Builder: New York Shipbuilding Corporation
- Laid down: 20 January 1915
- Launched: 30 June 1917
- Commissioned: 24 March 1919
- Decommissioned: 3 July 1946
- Honors and awards: 7 × battle stars
- Fate: Sold for scrap, 24 November 1947

General characteristics
- Class & type: New Mexico-class battleship
- Displacement: Normal: 32,000 long tons (32,514 t); Full load: 33,000 long tons (33,530 t)
- Length: 624 ft (190 m)
- Beam: 97 ft 5 in (29.69 m)
- Draft: 30 ft (9.1 m)
- Installed power: 9 × Babcock & Wilcox boilers; 32,000 shp (24,000 kW)
- Propulsion: 4 × steam turbines; 4 × screw propellers
- Speed: 21 kn (24 mph; 39 km/h)
- Complement: 1,081 officers and men
- Armament: 12 × 14 in (356 mm)/50 cal guns; 14 × 5 in (127 mm)/51 cal guns; 8 × 3 in (76 mm)/50 cal guns; 2 × Mark 15 21 in (533 mm) torpedo tubes
- Armor: Belt: 8–13.5 in (203–343 mm); Turret face: 18 in (457 mm); Conning tower: 11.5 in (292 mm); Decks: 3.5 in (89 mm)

USS Idaho, hull number BB-42, a New Mexico-class battleship, was the fourth ship of the United States Navy to be named for the 43rd state. She was the third of three ships of her class. Built by the New York Shipbuilding Corporation of Camden, New Jersey, she was launched in June 1917 and commissioned in March 1919. She was armed with a battery of twelve 14-inch (356 mm) guns in four three-gun turrets, and was protected by heavy armor plate, with her main belt armor being 13.5 inches (343 mm) thick.

Idaho spent most of the 1920s and 1930s in the Pacific Fleet, where she conducted routine training exercises. Like her sister ships, she was modernized in the early 1930s. In mid-1941, before the United States entered World War II, Idaho and her sisters were sent to join the Neutrality Patrols that protected American shipping during the Battle of the Atlantic. After Japan attacked Pearl Harbor on 7 December 1941, Idaho and her sisters were sent to the Pacific, where she supported amphibious operations in the Pacific. She shelled Japanese forces during the Gilbert and Marshall Islands and the Philippines campaigns and the invasions of Peleliu, Iwo Jima, and Okinawa.

Idaho was among the ships present in Tokyo Bay when Japan formally surrendered on 2 September 1945. With the war over, the ship was decommissioned in July 1946. She was sold to ship breakers in November 1947 and subsequently dismantled.

== Design ==
Idaho was 624 feet (190 m) long overall and had a beam of 97 ft 5 in (29.69 m) and a draft of 30 ft (9.1 m). She displaced 32,000 long tons (32,514 t) as designed and up to 33,000 long tons (33,530 t) at full combat load. The ship was powered by four-shaft Curtis turbines and nine oil-fired Babcock & Wilcox boilers rated at 32,000 shaft horsepower (24,000 kW), generating a top speed of 21 knots (39 km/h; 24 mph). The ship had a cruising range of 8,000 nautical miles (15,000 km; 9,200 mi) at a speed of 10 kn (19 km/h; 12 mph). Her crew numbered 1,081 officers and enlisted men. As built, she was fitted with two lattice masts with spotting tops for the main gun battery. The main armored belt was 8–13.5 in (203–343 mm) thick, while the main armored deck was up to 3.5 in (89 mm) thick. The main battery gun turrets had 18 in (457 mm) thick faces on 13 in (330 mm) barbettes. The conning tower had 16 in (406 mm) thick sides.

The ship was armed with a main battery of twelve 14-inch (356 mm)/50 caliber guns (Note: /50 caliber refers to the length of the gun in terms of caliber. The length of a /50 caliber gun is 50 times its bore diameter.) in four, three-gun turrets on the centerline, placed in two superfiring pairs forward and aft of the superstructure. Unlike earlier American battleships with triple turrets, these mounts allowed each barrel to elevate independently. The secondary battery consisted of fourteen 5-inch (127 mm)/51 caliber guns mounted in individual casemates clustered in the superstructure amidships. Initially, the ship was to have been fitted with twenty-two of the guns, but experiences in the North Sea during World War I demonstrated that the additional guns, which would have been placed in the hull, would have been unusable in anything but calm seas. As a result, the casemates were plated over to prevent flooding. The secondary battery was augmented with four 3-inch (76 mm)/50 caliber guns. In addition to her gun armament, Idaho was also fitted with two 21-inch (530 mm) torpedo tubes, mounted submerged in the hull, one on each broadside.

=== Modifications ===
Starting in 1921, the Navy began installing aircraft catapults on its battleships, and Idaho was among the vessels to receive a Mark II catapult. Idaho was heavily modernized in the early 1930s. Her original turbines were replaced with new geared models manufactured by Westinghouse, and she received six express boilers designed by the Bureau of Engineering. This improved her performance to a top speed of 22 knots (41 km/h; 25 mph) from 40,000 shaft horsepower (30,000 kW). Her armament was also revised, with the main battery turrets being modified to allow elevation to 30 degrees, greatly extending the range of the guns. Two of the 5-inch guns were removed, and eight 5-inch/25 caliber anti-aircraft guns were installed. She received an additional 2-inch (51 mm) armored deck, and her underwater protection was improved. Both lattice masts were removed; a heavy tower bridge was built in place of the fore mast, and a light pole mast was erected in place of the main mast. During the installation of the new bridge, she was fitted out as a flagship, which included the addition of a flag bridge for the admiral and his staff. These alterations greatly increased her displacement, to 33,420 long tons (33,960 t) standard and 36,157 long tons (36,737 t) full load. Her crew increased significantly, to 1,443.

During a refit from 14 October to 28 December 1942, Idaho received a new anti-aircraft battery of ten quadruple Bofors 40 mm (1.6 in) guns and forty-three 20 mm (0.79 in) Oerlikon guns, though the Oerlikons were added in stages. By the time the refit ended, she carried only sixteen of them, with eleven more added in January 1943, the remaining sixteen being added in February. From 22 October 1944 to 1 January 1945, Idaho received another major refit, which included the installation of ten 5-inch/38 caliber guns in individual, dual-purpose mounts in place of the old 25-caliber guns. She also received new Mark 8 radars for her main battery fire control system.

== Service history ==
=== Interwar period ===
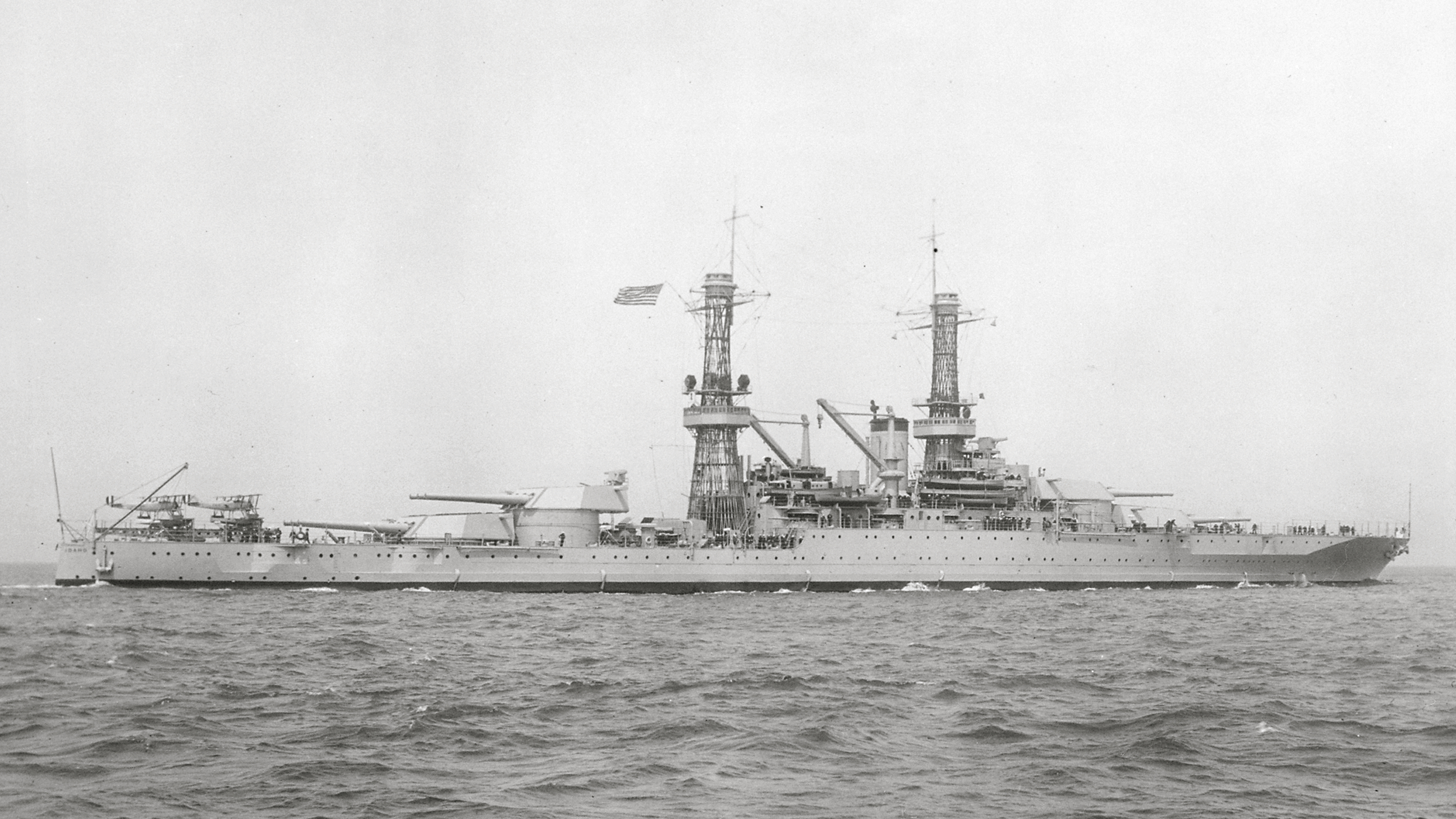
USS Idaho in 1927

Idaho was laid down on 20 January 1915 at the New York Shipbuilding Corporation in Camden, New Jersey. She was launched on 30 June 1917, and after fitting-out work ended, the new battleship was commissioned into the fleet on 24 March 1919. Shortly afterward, the ship began her shakedown cruise, departing on 13 April for Guantánamo Bay, Cuba, before returning to New York. There, the President of Brazil, Epitácio Pessoa, boarded the ship to return to Brazil. The trip began on 6 July; Idaho reached Rio de Janeiro on 17 July, where Pessoa left the ship, and continued on to the Panama Canal. She steamed to Monterey, California, where she joined the Pacific Fleet in September. The fleet then conducted a series of training exercises and held a naval review on 13 September for President Woodrow Wilson. Idaho hosted the Secretary of the Navy Josephus Daniels and the Secretary of the Interior John B. Payne for a tour of Alaska, which concluded on 22 July.

Idaho returned to the peacetime routine of fleet exercises over the next five years; these were held off the coast of North and South America, as far south as Chile. The ship was also present for a variety of ceremonies during this period, including a Naval Review for President Warren Harding in Seattle in 1923. The Pacific Fleet was reorganized as the Battle Fleet in 1922. She took part in major exercises off Hawaii in 1925, departing California on 15 April. The exercises lasted until 1 July, after which Idaho embarked on a cruise to the southern Pacific. Stops included Samoa, Australia, and New Zealand. While returning from Hawaii to California, she carried Commander John Rodgers, who had failed in his attempt to fly a seaplane from California to Hawaii. The ship reached San Francisco on 24 September. For the next six years, Idaho was based in San Pedro, where she continued to conduct readiness training, alternating between the Pacific and the Caribbean Sea.

On 7 September 1931, she departed San Pedro for the Norfolk Navy Yard, where she received a major reconstruction that began after her arrival on 30 September. The lengthy reconstruction finished on 9 October 1934, and after completing another shakedown cruise in the Caribbean, Idaho returned to San Pedro, arriving on 17 April 1935. Fleet maneuvers increased in frequency, particularly after tensions began to rise with Japan over its expansionist policies in Asia. In mid-1940, the Battle Fleet was transferred from California to Hawaii; Idaho joined the other ships on 1 July. By this time, World War II had broken out in Europe, spawning the Battle of the Atlantic. In response, President Franklin D. Roosevelt initiated the Neutrality Patrols to protect American shipping. On 7 May 1941, Admiral Harold Stark, the Chief of Naval Operations, transferred Idaho, her sisters Mississippi and New Mexico, the aircraft carrier Yorktown, four light cruisers, and two destroyer squadrons to the Atlantic to reinforce the Neutrality Patrols. Idaho left Hawaii on 6 June, bound for Hampton Roads to join the neutrality patrols. In September, she was stationed in Hvalfjörður, Iceland, and was there when Japan attacked Pearl Harbor on 7 December.

=== World War II ===
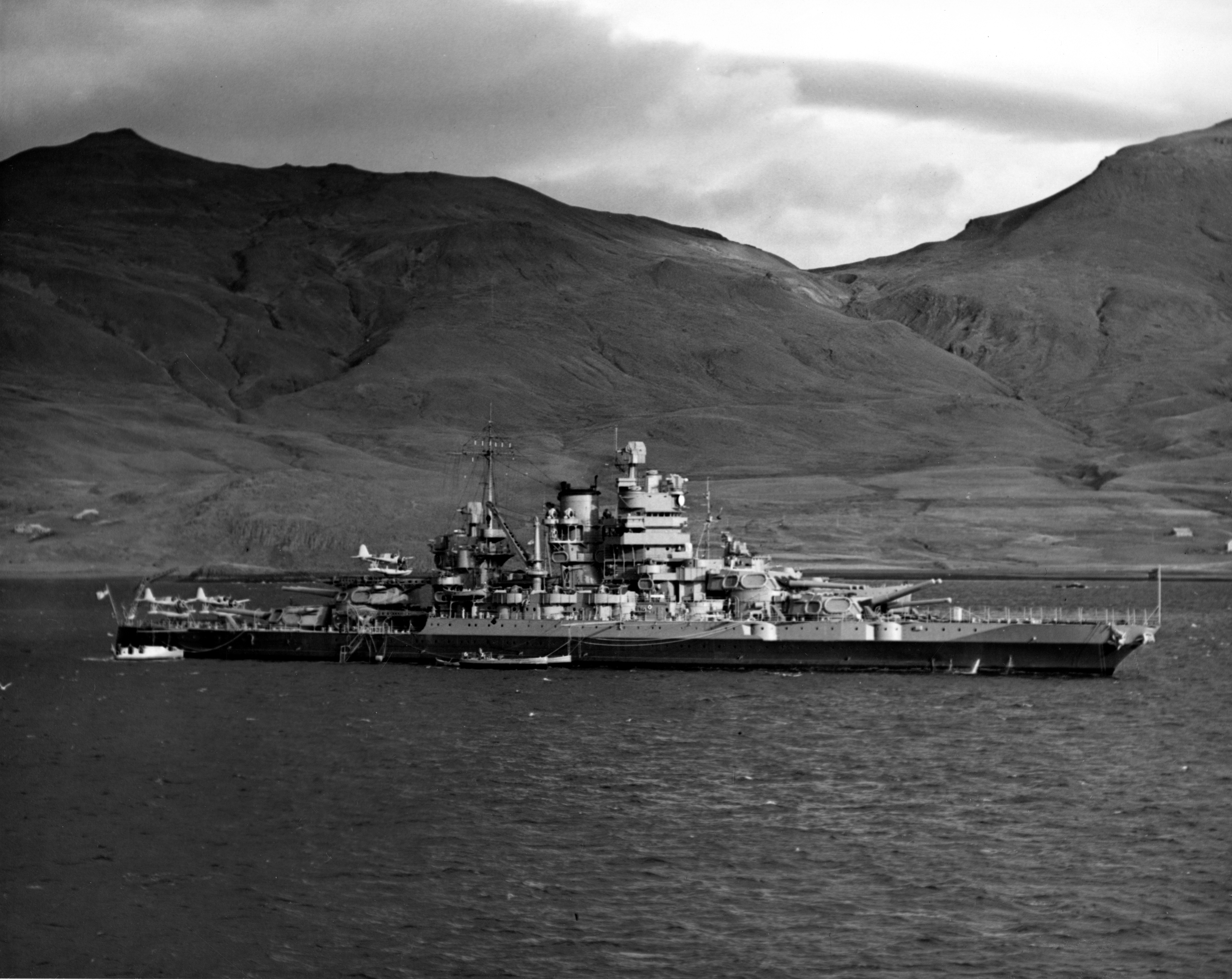
Idaho at Hvalfjörður, Iceland, October 1941

With the United States now an active participant in World War II, Idaho and Mississippi left Iceland on 9 December to rejoin the Pacific Fleet. They stopped in Norfolk before steaming through the Panama Canal and continuing on to San Francisco, where they arrived on 31 January 1942. For much of the year, Idaho was occupied with combat training off the coast of California. In October, she went to the Puget Sound Navy Yard to receive replacements for her worn out main battery guns. The original secondary battery of 5-inch/51 cal. guns was removed as these guns were badly needed to arm merchant ships. Further training followed until 7 April 1943, when she departed for the Aleutian Islands, where Japanese troops had occupied the islands of Attu and Kiska. Idaho served as the flagship of the bombardment and patrol force. On 11 May, US Army forces went ashore on Attu, and Idaho provided gunfire support for the assault. The following month, a second attack followed on Kiska, but the Japanese had already abandoned the island in July. On 7 September, Idaho returned to San Francisco to begin preparations for the next major amphibious assault, which shifted focus to the central Pacific.

Idaho moved to Pearl Harbor and on 10 November joined the invasion fleet, which then steamed to the Gilbert Islands. They arrived off Makin Atoll on 20 November; Idaho continued her role as gunfire support for the next two weeks, shelling Japanese positions in the Gilberts as well as contributing her antiaircraft battery to defend against Japanese aerial attacks. On 5 December, she left the area for Pearl Harbor, where she prepared for the next attack, against the Marshall Islands. On 31 January 1944, Idaho and the rest of the fleet arrived off Kwajalein to begin the preparatory bombardment. She continued to batter Japanese forces until 5 February, by which time the Marines had wrested control of the small island from its Japanese garrison. Idaho replenished fuel and ammunition at Majuro, returned to shell Japanese positions on other islands in the Marshalls, and then steamed to Kavieng, New Ireland to conduct a diversionary bombardment on 20 March.

On 25 March, Idaho arrived in the New Hebrides, before continuing on to Australia for a brief stay. She returned to Kwajalein on 8 June, where she joined a group of escort carriers for the invasion of the Mariana Islands. Idaho began the preparatory bombardment of Saipan on 14 June, with the assault taking place the following day. Idaho then shifted to Guam, where she shelled Japanese positions. During the Battle of the Philippine Sea on 19–20 June, Idaho remained with the invasion fleet and protected the troop transports and supply ships. She steamed to Eniwetok in the Marshalls to replenish her stocks of ammunition from 28 June to 9 July, before returning to Guam on 12 July. She bombarded the island for eight days before ground troops went ashore on 21 July. The ship continued to support American forces ashore until 2 August, when she returned to Eniwetok for further supplies. From there, she steamed to Espiritu Santo, where on 15 August she entered a floating dry dock for repairs.

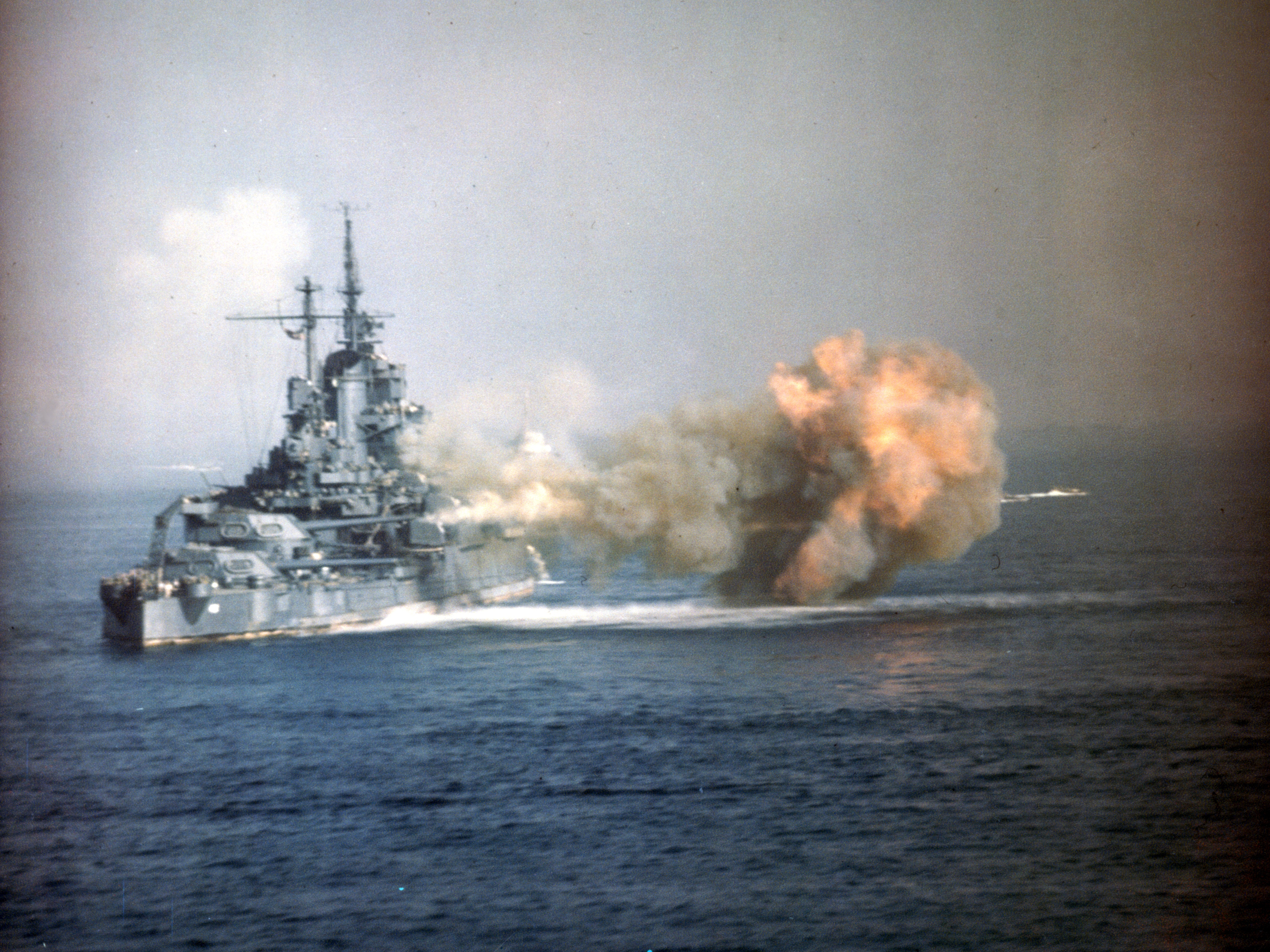
Idaho bombarding Okinawa in 1945

In early September, Idaho steamed to Guadalcanal, where she took part in amphibious assault training. On 12 September, she steamed to Peleliu and joined the preparatory bombardment of the island. In the ensuing Battle of Peleliu, dug in Japanese defenders inflicted heavy casualties on the assaulting Marines, with Idaho providing artillery support until 24 September, when she withdrew for an overhaul. She steamed to Manus and then to Bremerton, Washington, arriving on 22 October. During the refit, the 5-inch /25 cal. guns were replaced by ten 5-inch /38 cal. guns in single enclosed mounts; she was the only ship of her class to receive this modification. The installation of these guns required the removal of the last of the old 5-inch /51 guns, as the new weapons required continuous ammunition hoists. After completion of the work, she conducted training off California. On 28 January 1945, Idaho departed San Diego, bound for Pearl Harbor. There, she joined the bombardment group, which proceeded to the Marianas and then on 14 February steamed north to Iwo Jima, the target of the next major amphibious assault. The ship bombarded the Japanese defenders on 19 February as the Marines went ashore; Idaho remained there for nearly a month before withdrawing on 7 March to replenish at Ulithi.

On 21 March, Idaho joined Task Force 54 (TF 54), the Gunfire and Covering Group under the command of Rear Admiral Morton Deyo, as the flagship of Bombardment Unit 4 for the invasion of Okinawa. She began shelling Okinawa on 25 March, and the landings started on 1 April. The battle marked the height of the kamikaze attacks by the increasingly desperate Japanese defenders. Idaho shot down five kamikazes in a massed attack on 12 April, and in return, a near miss inflicted damage to her port side anti-torpedo bulge. Temporary repairs were effected off Okinawa, and on 20 April she left for Guam, arriving on the 25th. Permanent repairs were completed quickly, allowing the ship to return to Okinawa on 22 May, where she resumed her fire support mission. She operated off Okinawa until 20 June, before departing for the Philippines. There, she conducted training operations in Leyte Gulf until Japan agreed to surrender on 15 August. Idaho was among the ships to enter Tokyo Bay on 27 August, carrying a detachment of occupation troops. She was present during the signing of the surrender documents on 2 September. The ship left Japanese waters on 6 September, bound for the east coast of the United States. She arrived in Norfolk on 16 October, and was decommissioned there on 3 July 1946. She remained in reserve for a year and a half, and was sold for scrap on 24 November 1947 to Lipsett, Inc., of New York City.

In 1976, the silver service from Idaho's mess was stolen from the Idaho State Historical Society museum in Boise. Except for a tray the burglars dropped on their way out, the service was never recovered and may have been melted down and sold for scrap.
