= 14-inch/50-caliber gun =

14"/50 caliber gun
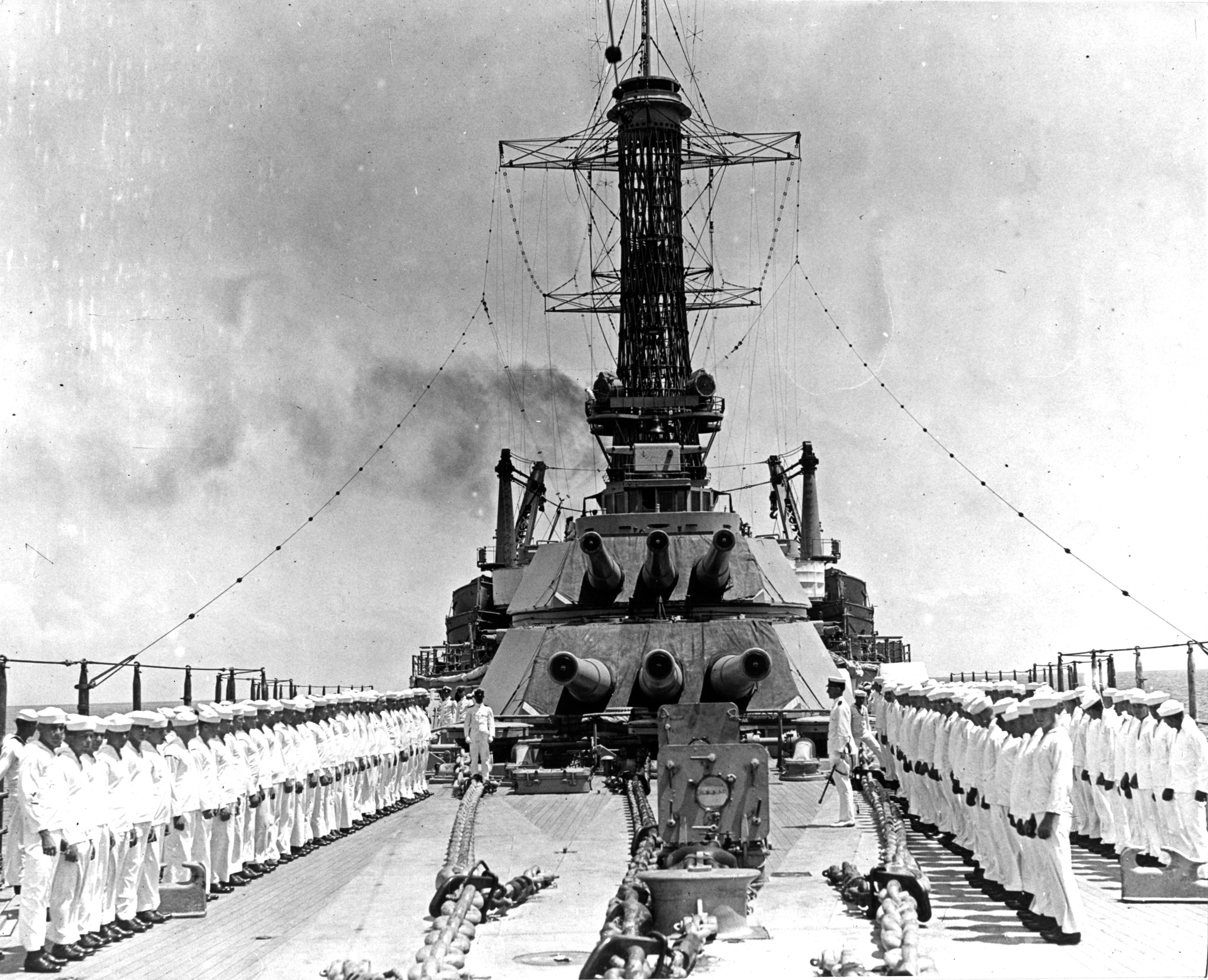
- New Mexico-class battleship USS Idaho (BB-42) in 1920, showing six 14"/50 caliber guns
- Type: Naval gun
- Place of origin: United States

Service history
- In service: 1918–1956
- Used by: US Navy
- Wars: World War II

Production history
- Designer: Bureau of Ordnance
- Designed: Mark 4: 1916; Mark 7: 1930; Mark 11: 1935; Mark B: 1937
- Manufacturer: U.S. Naval Gun Factory
- No. built: Mark 4 Mod 0: 39 (Nos. 82–120); Mark 4 Mod 1: 80 (Nos. 121–200)
- Variants: Marks 4, 6, 7, 11 and B

Specifications
- Mass: 179,614 lb (81,472 kg) (with breech)
- Length: 59.5 ft (18.1 m)
- Barrel length: 700 in (18 m) bore (50 calibers)
- Shell: Mark 8: 1,402 lb (636 kg) Armor-piercing (AP); AP Mark 16: 1,500 lb (680 kg) AP; HC Mark 19: 1,275 lb (578 kg) High explosive (HC)
- Caliber: 14-inch (356 mm)
- Recoil: 48-inch (1,220 mm)
- Elevation: New Mexico-class: -5° to +15° (later increased to 30°); All other: -5° to +30°
- Traverse: 306° max 297° min
- Rate of fire: Marks 4, 6, 7, 11: 1.75 rounds per minute; Mark B: 2 rounds per minute
- Muzzle velocity: Mark 4 and 6: 2,800 ft/s (850 m/s); Marks 7, 11, and B: 2,700 ft/s (820 m/s) AP; Marks 7, 11, and B: 2,825 ft/s (861 m/s) HC; Reduced charge: 1,935 ft/s (590 m/s) AP; Reduced charge: 2,065 ft/s (629 m/s) HC
- Effective firing range: 25,000-yard (22,860 m) at 15° elevation HC
- Maximum firing range: 36,800 yd (33,600 m) at 30° elevation AP

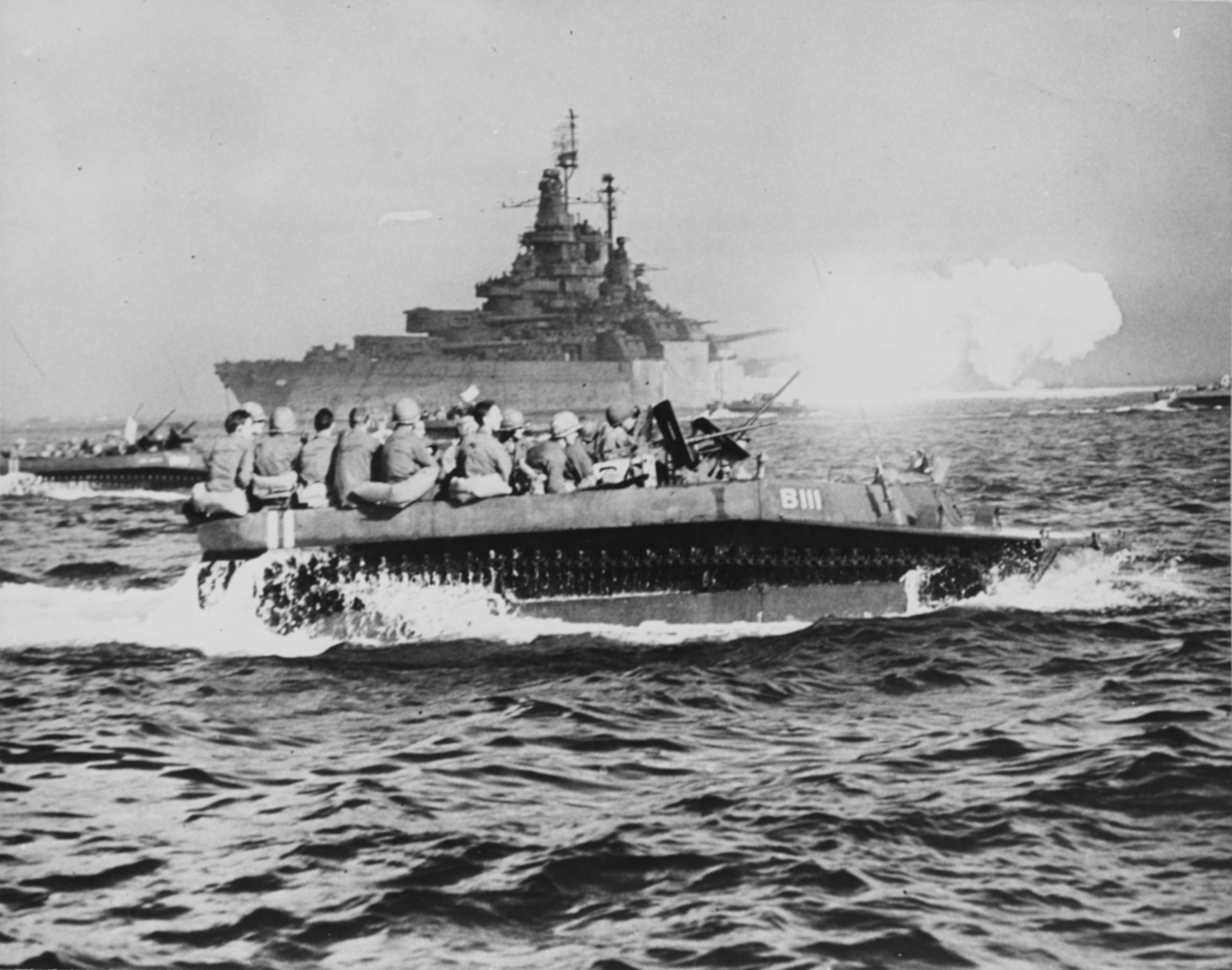
The 14"/50 caliber guns on USS Tennessee (BB-43) fire in support of the invasion of Okinawa

The 14"/50 caliber gun was a naval gun mounted on New Mexico and Tennessee-class battleships. These ships also featured the first "three-gun" turrets, meaning that each gun in each turret could be "individually sleeved" to elevate separately (however, they could be linked so they would elevate as a unit, similar to the triple turrets on other Navy ships). The 14"/50 caliber guns were designated as Mark 4 and 6, with later versions known as Mark 7, and 11. These guns were more powerful than the main gun mounted on the previous three classes of US battleships (the New York, Nevada and Pennsylvania classes), the 14"/45 caliber gun. A newer version known as Mark B was proposed but ultimately not used for the North Carolina-class battleships.

== History ==
The 14-inch (356mm), 50 caliber gun was the weapon chosen as the main armament on the Lexington-class battlecruiser when they were originally designed, but it was later switched to the 16"/50 caliber Mark 2 gun in a 1917 redesign. The ships were eventually canceled in 1922 after the Washington Naval Treaty was signed.

The 14"/50 caliber gun was designed in 1916 and entered service in 1918 on the New Mexico-class battleships. The guns were capable of firing a 1,402 pounds (636 kg) armor-piercing (AP) projectile at an angle of 15 degrees, to a range of 24,000 yards (21,946 m). Each gun weighed approximately 179,614 pounds (81,472 kg), including the breech, and was 59.5 feet (18.1 m) long. The propellant charge used for the ammunition weighed 470 pounds (210 kg) and was contained in four bags.

Each Mark 4 built-up gun consisted of a tube, liner, and a screw box liner with a separate screwed-on flange. Three hoops and two locking rings were also included. The Mark 6 was slightly different in that it contained a single step taper liner and uniform twist rifling. Downward-opening Welin breech blocks and Smith-Asbury mechanisms were used on both Mark 4 and Mark 6 types. The Navy encountered dispersion problems at extreme ranges with these guns in the 1920s. Several methods were used to correct these problems, including correction of range tables for errors, addition of delay coils, reduction of chamber volume, and improvement of shot seating.

The Mark 7 was designed in the 1930s and entered service in 1935. This gun included a smaller chamber, a shell-centering cone, a single-slope band seat, uniform rifling, and a tube locking ring. The Mark 11 was introduced later, with chromium plating added to the bore. New Mexico- and Tennessee-class battleships were rearmed with 14"/50 Mark 11 guns, with the Tennessee receiving the upgrade in 1942. The dispersion problems that existed with Marks 4 and 6 were corrected with these guns.

=== Proposed Mark B ===
A newer version of the 14"/50 caliber gun, Mark B, was designed in 1937. It was the original gun intended for use on the North Carolina-class battleships, in three quadruple turrets. The Mark B was the most powerful 14 inch weapon ever designed by the United States, being simpler and lighter than the older versions. However, the prototype of this gun was not completed because the 14 inch treaty limit was rescinded in 1937 which allowed the new battleships, despite being already under construction, to be modified in order to carry 16 inch/45-caliber Mark 6 guns.

== Naval action ==
The 14"/50 caliber gun was installed on five battleships: New Mexico, Mississippi, Idaho, Tennessee, and California. Although both Tennessee and California were damaged during the attack on Pearl Harbor, both of these ships' guns, along with the other three, were used in the Second World War in shore bombardment duty. Mississippi, Tennessee, and California all participated in the last line battle to date: the Battle of Surigao Strait. As shore bombardment platforms, these five battleships participated in all phases of the war, such as the Aleutian Islands Campaign (Idaho, Tennessee), the Battle of Kwajalein (New Mexico, Mississippi, Idaho, Tennessee), and the Battle of Guam (New Mexico, Idaho, Tennessee, California).

== Naval service ==
Ship	Gun Installed	Gun Mount
Lexington-class battlecruiser (1916 design)	Guns: 14"/50 caliber (never installed)	Turrets: 2 × two-gun turrets (never installed); 3 × three-gun turrets (never installed)
New Mexico-class battleship	Guns: 14"/50 caliber	Turrets: 4 × three-gun turrets
Tennessee-class battleship	Guns: 14"/50 caliber	Turrets: 4 × three-gun turrets
North Carolina-class battleship (1935 "B" proposed design)	Guns: 14"/50 caliber (never installed)	Turrets: 3 × four-gun turrets (never installed)

== Railway artillery ==
During World War I, five of the 14"/50 caliber guns served as railway guns on the Western Front in France. Gun No. 119L2, a Mark 2 gun on a Mark 1 Railway Mount No. 148, is located at the US Navy Museum, Washington Navy Yard, Washington, D.C. Gun No. 19, on an M1918 Railway Mount No. 9, built by the Marion Steam Shovel Company, is located at the US Army Ordnance School, Fort Gregg-Adams, Virginia.

== See also ==
- 14"/45 caliber gun – an earlier American gun of the same caliber

=== Weapons of comparable role, performance and era ===
- 14-inch gun M1910 US Army coast defense equivalent
- BL 13.5-inch Mk V naval gun contemporary British equivalent to Marks 4, 6, 7, 11
- BL 14-inch Mk VII naval gun contemporary British equivalent to Mark B
- Vickers 14 inch/45 naval gun contemporary Vickers-designed Japanese equivalent

== Bibliography ==
- Morison, Samuel Loring; Polmar, Norman (2003). The American Battleship. St. Paul, Minnesota: Zenith Imprint. ISBN 0-7603-0989-2.
- Breck, Edward (1922). The United States naval railway batteries in France. Washington, D.C.: U.S. Government Printing Office.
