= 5-inch/51-caliber gun =

20th-century naval gun of the United States Navy

5"/51 caliber gun
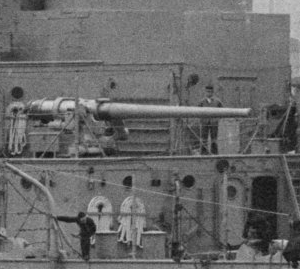
- 5"/51 caliber Mark 8 gun on starboard forecastle of USS Texas, March 1914
- Type: Naval gun; Coastal defence; Coast Guard gun
- Place of origin: United States

Service history
- In service: 1911–c. 1947
- Used by: United States Navy; United States Marine Corps; United States Coast Guard; Royal Navy
- Wars: World War I; World War II

Production history
- Designer: Bureau of Ordnance
- Designed: 1910
- Manufacturer: Naval Gun Factory; American & British Mfg. Co. (Nos. 702–727); Watervliet Arsenal (Nos. 768–787); Liberty Ordnance Co. (Nos. 898–1043); Four Lakes Ordnance Co. (Nos. 1157–1356); Midvale Steel (Nos. 1457–1504 and 1705–1716); American Can Co. (Nos. 1505–1518)
- No. built: Mark 7: 93 (Nos. 357–449); Mark 8: 1004 (NGF 539 Nos. 450-unknown)(see builders) (No Nos. 1357–1456, 1519–1604 or 1633–1704); Mark 9: 3 (Unknown Nos.); Mark 14: relined Mark 8s; Mark 15: enlarged chamber Mark 14s
- Variants: Marks 7, 8, 9, 14, 15

Specifications
- Mass: Mark 7: 11,274 lb (5,114 kg) (with breech); Mark 8: 10,834 lb (4,914 kg) (without breech); Mark 8: 11,300 lb (5,100 kg) (with breech); Mark 9: 10,824 lb (4,910 kg) (without breech); Mark 9: 11,375 lb (5,160 kg) (with breech)
- Length: 261.25 in (6,636 mm)
- Barrel length: 255 in (6,500 mm) bore (51 calibers)
- Shell: 50–55.18 lb (22.68–25.03 kg)
- Caliber: 5 in (127 mm)
- Breech: side swing Welin-type
- Elevation: P13: -10° to +20° (late version); P15: -15° to +20°; Mark 18: -8.5° to +25°
- Traverse: up to 360° depending on location
- Rate of fire: 8-9 rounds per minute
- Muzzle velocity: 3,150 ft/s (960 m/s) (full charge); 2,300 ft/s (700 m/s) (reduced charge)
- Effective firing range: 17,000 yd (16,000 m) at 20° elevation
- Maximum firing range: 20,142 yd (18,418 m) at 45° elevation (World War II ammunition)

5"/51 caliber guns (spoken "five-inch-fifty-one-caliber") initially served as the secondary battery of United States Navy battleships built from 1907 through the 1920s, also serving on other vessels. United States naval gun terminology indicates the gun fired a projectile 5-inch (127 mm) in diameter, and the barrel was 51 calibers long.

== Description ==
The different marks of the gun were Marks 7, 8, 9, 14, and 15. The built-up gun consisted of a tube, full-length jacket, and single hoop with side swing Welin breech block and Smith-Asbury mechanism for a total weight of about 5 metric tons. Some Marks included a tapered liner. A 24.5 lb (11.1 kg) charge of smokeless powder gave a 50-pound (22.7 kg) projectile a velocity of 3,150 ft/s (960 m/s). Range was 15,850 yards (9.0 statute miles or 14.5 kilometres) at the maximum elevation of 20 degrees. Useful life expectancy was 900 effective full charges (EFC) per liner.

== US service ==
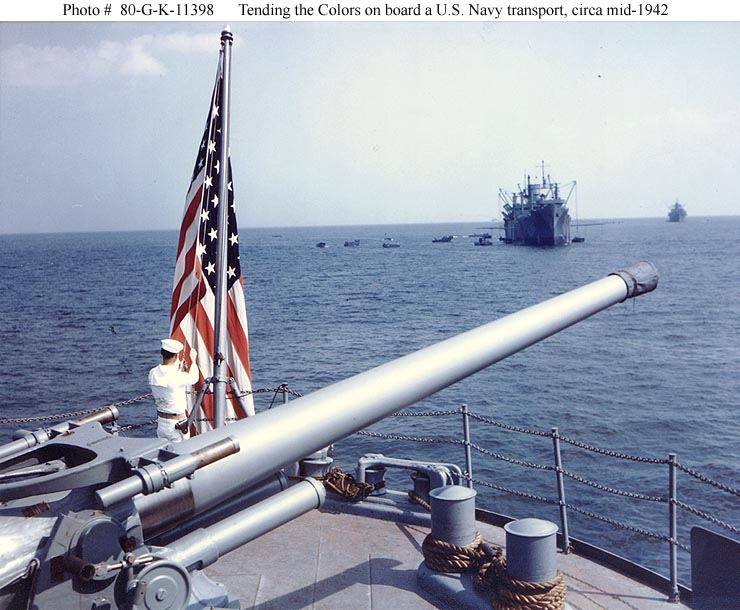
On a US Navy transport ship c. mid 1942

The 5-inch/51 caliber gun was designed to engage destroyers, torpedo boats, and other surface targets. The 5"/51 gun entered service in 1911 as secondary armament on the Florida-class battleships, which mounted 16. The guns served well through World War I, but increased awareness of the need for anti-aircraft protection (especially following the attack on Pearl Harbor) encouraged mounting of dual-purpose 5"/38 caliber guns in later battleships, and some of the World War I-era battleships were rearmed with dual purpose guns as well. Surplus 5"/51 guns from scrapped or rearmed battleships were mounted in United States Coast Guard cutters, auxiliaries, small aircraft carriers, coast defense batteries, and Defensively Equipped Merchant Ships. A 1939 Table of Organization and Equipment shows Marine defense battalions were equipped with six of these guns each. 5-inch/51 shore batteries were used with great effectiveness by the 1st Marine Defense Battalion during the Battle of Wake Island in December 1941. These were replaced in the defense battalions by the 155 mm Long Tom gun by 1943. Six Tambor-class submarines were rearmed with "wet mount" 5-inch/51 guns during World War II, taken from Barracuda-class submarines or spares for that class.

The 5"/51 caliber gun was mounted on:

- USS Olympia (C-6) - replacing 10 5"/40 and 4 8"/35 guns in 1917
- USS Chester (CL-1) - replacing 2 5"/50 and 4 3"/50 guns in 1917
- USS Birmingham (CL-2) - replacing 2 5"/50 and 4 3"/50 guns in 1917
- USS Salem (CL-3) - replacing 2 5"/50 and 4 3"/50 guns in 1917
- USS Florida (BB-30)
- USS Utah (BB-31)
- USS Wyoming (BB-32)
- USS Arkansas (BB-33)
- USS New York (BB-34) (Gun nos. 489–509)
- USS Texas (BB-35) (Gun nos. 468–488)
- USS Nevada (BB-36)
- USS Oklahoma (BB-37)
- USS Pennsylvania (BB-38)
- USS Arizona (BB-39)
- USS New Mexico (BB-40)
- USS Mississippi (BB-41)
- USS Idaho (BB-42)
- USS Tennessee (BB-43)
- USS California (BB-44)
- USS Colorado (BB-45)
- USS Maryland (BB-46)
- USS West Virginia (BB-48)
- Five Clemson-class destroyers:
  - USS Hatfield (DD-231)
  - USS Brooks (DD-232)
  - USS Gilmer (DD-233)
  - USS Fox (DD-234)
  - USS Kane (DD-235)
- USS Barracuda (SS-163)
- USS Bass (SS-164)
- USS Bonita (SS-165)
- USS Langley (CV-1)
- USS Long Island (CVE-1)
- USS Sangamon (CVE-26)
- USS Suwannee (CVE-27)
- USS Chenango (CVE-28)
- USS Santee (CVE-29)
- USS Charger (CVE-30)
- Bogue-class escort carriers
- Tambor-class submarines
- Treasury-class cutters
- Banff-class sloops (USCG Lake class cutters)
- Tampa-class cutters

== Army coast defense use ==
5"/51 caliber ex-Navy guns were emplaced during World War II at several locations, some operated by the United States Army Coast Artillery Corps and some by Marine defense battalions. This list may not be exhaustive. They were grouped into two-gun batteries unless otherwise noted.

- Two guns near Cape Lookout, NC
- Three guns in Battery Gillespie, Point Loma, San Diego, CA
- Three guns in Battery Ahua, Fort Kamehameha, Oahu, HI
- Two guns in Battery Nanakuli, Oahu, HI
- Two guns in Battery Oneula (Ewa), Oahu, HI
- Two guns at Kahana Bay, North Shore, Oahu, HI

== British service ==
In British service these guns were known as 5"/51 BL Mark VI and Mark VII. During World War I three of these guns formed part of the coastal defences of Scapa Flow. In World War II a small number of these guns entered British service on board ships transferred under the Lend-Lease arrangement. Some of these guns were then transferred to New Zealand (at least six, possibly more) and deployed ashore for coastal defence.

== Surviving examples ==
Surviving 5"/51 caliber guns include:

- Eight guns on USS Olympia (C-6), preserved at the Independence Seaport Museum in Philadelphia, Pennsylvania (guns previously on USS Colorado (BB-45))
- Six guns preserved on USS Texas (BB-35) near Houston, Texas
- One Mark 8 gun (Four Lakes #1205) at Trumbo Point, Key West, Florida (part of Naval Air Station Key West)
- One gun (Unk. mfr. #1093L2) at the Ropkey Armor Museum, Crawfordsville, Indiana (previously on USS Arizona (BB-39) and allegedly on USS Indiana (BB-1) at some time)
- Two Mark 7 guns (Watervliet #774 and #Unk.) on Midway Island, Central Pacific Ocean
- One Mark 7 gun (Naval Gun Factory (NGF) #415L) at the NROTC facility, Tulane University, New Orleans, Louisiana
- One Mark 15 gun (NGF #736L) at the U.S. Navy Museum, Washington Navy Yard, Washington, DC (previously on USS Idaho (BB-42))
- One 5"/51 caliber gun at Fort Schuyler, Bronx, New York (possibly at USMMA, Kings Point, New York)
- One 5"/51 caliber gun at Treasure Island, San Francisco, California (behind museum)
- One Mark 15 gun in Lewiston, Maine
- One Mark 15 gun (Bethlehem #Unk.) at the Brunswick Executive Airport, Brunswick, Maine (formerly NAS Brunswick)
- One 5"/51 caliber gun in Mitchell, Indiana
- One Mark 9 Mod 3 gun (NGF #938L), at The American Military Museum, South El Monte, California
- One 5"/51 caliber gun at the Veterans Memorial Museum, Chehalis, WA
- Two 5"/51 caliber guns at the Veterans Memorial in Haddon Heights, NJ

== See also ==
=== Weapons of comparable role, performance and era ===
- BL 4.7-inch 45-calibre naval gun : British equivalent
- 12 cm/45 3rd Year Type naval gun : Japanese equivalent
- 120 mm 50 caliber Pattern 1905 : Russian equivalent
