= Charles E. Mower =

United States Army Medal of Honor recipient

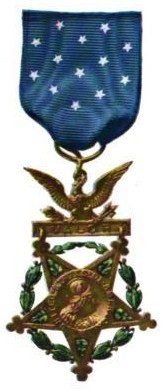
- Born: November 29, 1924; Chippewa Falls, Wisconsin
- Died: November 3, 1944 (aged 19) near Capoocan, Leyte, the Philippines
- Burial place: Manila American Cemetery and Memorial, Taguig, Philippines
- Military career
- Allegiance: United States of America
- Branch: United States Army
- Rank: Sergeant
- Units: 1st Battalion, 34th Infantry Regiment, 24th Infantry Division
- Conflicts: World War II
- Awards: Medal of Honor; Purple Heart

Charles E. Mower (November 29, 1924 – November 3, 1944) was a United States Army soldier and a recipient of the United States military's highest decoration—the Medal of Honor—for his actions in World War II.

Mower joined the Army from his birth city of Chippewa Falls, Wisconsin, and by November 3, 1944, was serving as a Sergeant in Company A, 1st Battalion, 34th Infantry Regiment, 24th Infantry Division during the Battle of Leyte. During an attack against Japanese positions that day, near Capoocan, Leyte, in the Philippines, Mower took command of his squad after the leader was killed and led his men from an exposed position despite being seriously wounded. He was killed during the battle and, on February 11, 1946, posthumously awarded the Medal of Honor.

Mower was buried at the Manila American Cemetery and Memorial in Taguig, Philippines.

== Medal of Honor citation ==
Sergeant Mower's official Medal of Honor citation reads:

He was an assistant squad leader in an attack against strongly defended enemy positions on both sides of a stream running through a wooded gulch. As the squad advanced through concentrated fire, the leader was killed and Sgt. Mower assumed command. In order to bring direct fire upon the enemy, he had started to lead his men across the stream, which by this time was churned by machinegun and rifle fire, but he was severely wounded before reaching the opposite bank. After signaling his unit to halt, he realized his own exposed position was the most advantageous point from which to direct the attack, and stood fast. Half submerged, gravely wounded, but refusing to seek shelter or accept aid of any kind, he continued to shout and signal to his squad as he directed it in the destruction of 2 enemy machineguns and numerous riflemen. Discovering that the intrepid man in the stream was largely responsible for the successful action being taken against them, the remaining Japanese concentrated the full force of their firepower upon him, and he was killed while still urging his men on. Sgt. Mower's gallant initiative and heroic determination aided materially in the successful completion of his squad's mission. His magnificent leadership was an inspiration to those with whom he served.

== Legacy ==
In 1947, USS Tryon (APH-1) was reconfigured and placed in service as the Sgt. Charles E. Mower. The Mower last operated as a dependent transport shuttling between San Francisco and Pearl Harbor until she was inactivated in 1954.

== See also ==
- List of Medal of Honor recipients for World War II
