= USS Tryon =

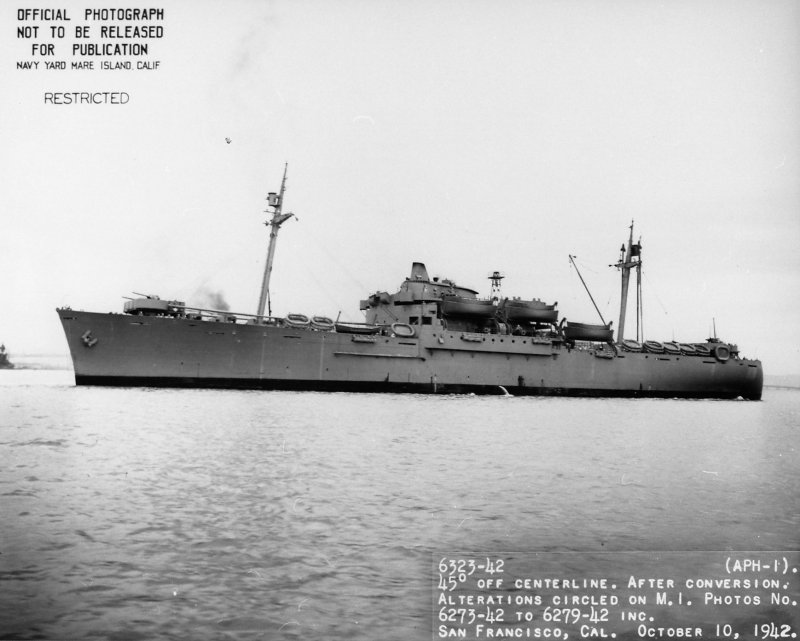
- USS Tryon (APH-1) in San Francisco Bay shortly before deployment.

History

United States
- Name: USS Tryon
- Namesake: James R. Tryon
- Builder: Moore Dry Dock Company, Oakland, California
- Laid down: 26 March 1941
- Launched: 21 October 1941 as SS Alcoa Courier
- Commissioned: 30 September 1942 as Tryon (APH-1)
- Decommissioned: 20 March 1946
- Stricken: 17 April 1946
- Honours and awards: 6 battle stars (WWII)
- Fate: Transferred to the US Army, 17 July 1946
- Name: USAT Sgt. Charles E. Mower
- Namesake: Charles E. Mower
- Acquired: 17 July 1946
- In service: 25 August 1947
- Out of service: 1950
- Fate: Transferred to the Military Sea Transportation Service
- Name: USNS Sgt. Charles E. Mower (T-AP-186)
- Acquired: 1 March 1950
- In service: 1950
- Out of service: 16 June 1954
- Stricken: 1 July 1960

General characteristics
- Type: Tryon-class Evacuation Transport
- Displacement: 9,920 long tons (10,079 t) light
- Length: 450 ft (140 m)
- Beam: 62 ft (19 m)
- Draft: 23 ft 6 in (7.16 m)
- Propulsion: Steam turbine, single shaft, 8,500 hp (6,338 kW)
- Speed: 18 knots (33 km/h; 21 mph)
- Capacity: 1,274 troops
- Complement: 460 officers and enlisted
- Armament: 1 × 5"/38 caliber gun; 12 × single 40 mm AA guns

USS Tryon (APH-1) was laid down as SS Alcoa Courier (MC hull 175) on 26 March 1941, by the Moore Dry Dock Company, Oakland, California and launched on 21 October 1941 sponsored by Mrs. Roy G. Hunt. After the attack on Pearl Harbor, she was designated for U.S. Navy use and assigned the name Comfort in June 1942. Comfort was renamed Tryon on 13 August 1942, acquired by the U.S. Navy on 29 September 1942, and commissioned on 30 September 1942.

== World War II ==
Tryon, an Evacuation Transport, got underway for San Diego on 9 October 1942 and departed from there on the 21st, bound for New Caledonia. On 7 November, she arrived at Noumea; joined the Service Squadron, South Pacific; and remained with that organization for the next 15 months, evacuating combat casualties from the Solomons to Suva, Noumea, Wellington, Auckland, and Brisbane. On her return trips to the forward areas, she carried priority cargo and troops for forces fighting the Japanese.

Tryon's first combat duty came in the Marianas during the summer of 1944. On 16 July, she joined Task Force 51 at Lunga Point and sortied for the invasion of Tinian. The hospital transport arrived off the beaches on the 24th, combat loaded with troops and equipment. After unloading, she embarked casualties for a week and then got underway for the Marshalls. The ship called at Eniwetok, New Caledonia, Espiritu Santo, and the Russell Islands before anchoring off Guadalcanal on 27 August 1944.

Tryon embarked 1,323 Marines of the 1st Marine Division and sortied on 8 September 1944, with Transport Division 6 of Task Force 32, for the assault on the Palaus. She was off the beaches of Peleliu on the morning of the 15th and disembarked elements of the assault wave. Then, serving as a hospital evacuation ship, she embarked 812 combat casualties and, on the 20th, stood out for Manus. She disembarked the patients at Seeadler Harbor four days later and headed back to Peleliu the next morning. The ship remained off the beaches from 28 September to 4 October and then joined a convoy bound for the Solomons.

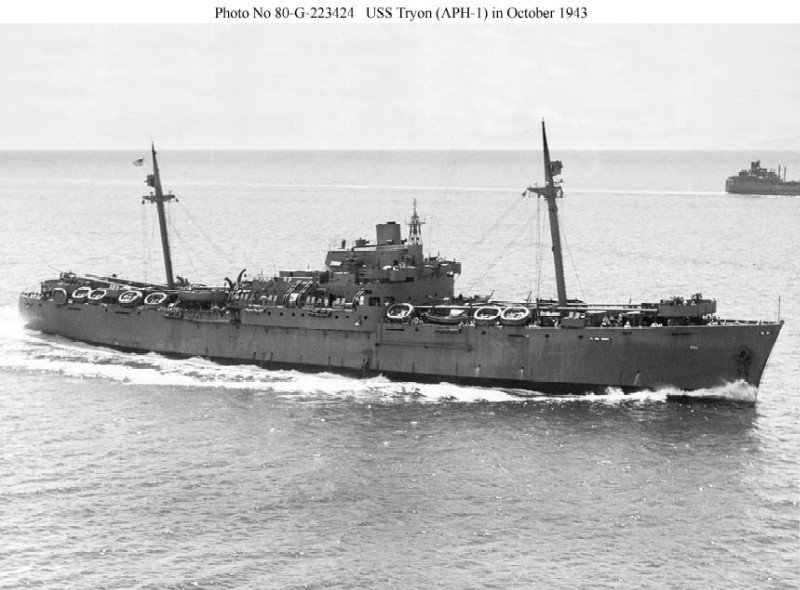
USS Tryon (APH-1) at sea during World War II

When Tryon arrived at Tulagi on 11 October, she was assigned to the 7th Fleet to participate in the Leyte campaign. She called at Hollandia and Humboldt Bay en route and reached Leyte on the 30th. The ship completed unloading the next day and began the return voyage to the South Pacific. The transport loaded troops and cargo at Langemak Bay from 13 through 27 December and headed for Manus on 28 December 1944.

On 2 January 1945, Tryon stood out of Manus with Task Group 77.9, the reinforcement group, for the invasion of Luzon on the beaches of the Lingayen Gulf. She arrived off San Fabian on the morning of the 11th and began unloading troops and supplies. From 13 to 27 January, she received casualties on board and headed to Leyte Gulf where they were transferred to USS Hope (AH-7) and USS Bountiful (AH-9). On 2 February, she joined a convoy and departed for the Solomons.

On 22 February, the evacuation hospital ship got underway and proceeded via Pearl Harbor to the United States for an overhaul. She arrived at San Francisco on 11 March and remained in the navy yard until 20 May. After refresher training in San Diego, she sailed for Hawaii on 3 June and arrived at Pearl Harbor the following week. The transport then called at Eniwetok, Guam, and San Francisco before returning to Hawaii on 2 August. The next day, she headed for Guam and arrived there on the 15th to hear that hostilities with Japan had ceased. Tryon was routed to the Philippines, embarked occupation troops at Leyte, and joined a convoy for Japan on 1 September. The transport disembarked the troops at Yokohama and received liberated Allied prisoners of war en board for transportation to the Philippines. She disembarked them at Manila on the 18th.

== Post-war operations ==
On 1 October, Tryon was assigned to the "Magic Carpet" fleet which was established at the end of the war to return troops to the United States. She served with it through the end of the year. In mid-January 1946, the ship was slated for inactivation. She was decommissioned at Seattle on 20 March 1946, returned to the War Shipping Administration in April, and struck from the Navy list on 17 April 1946.

Tryon was turned over to the United States Army on 17 July 1946 and converted into a troop transport by the Todd Shipyard, Seattle, Washington. She emerged from the yard on 25 August 1947 and was placed in service as USAT Sgt. Charles E. Mower.

The Secretary of Defense, by a directive dated 2 August 1949, established a unified sea transportation service; and, on 1 March 1950, the ship was transferred back to the Navy Department, assigned to the Military Sea Transportation Service, and designated T-AP-186. USNS Sgt. Charles E. Mower operated as a dependent transport shuttling between San Francisco and Pearl Harbor until she was inactivated in 1954.

Sgt. Charles E. Mower was placed out of service, in reserve, on 16 June 1954; transferred to the reserve fleet at Suisun Bay; and struck from the Navy list on 1 July 1960.

== Awards ==
USS Tryon (APH–1) earned six battle stars during World War II.

== See also ==
- Evacuation transport
