= USS Rixey =

Casualty evacuation transport ship in the US Navy

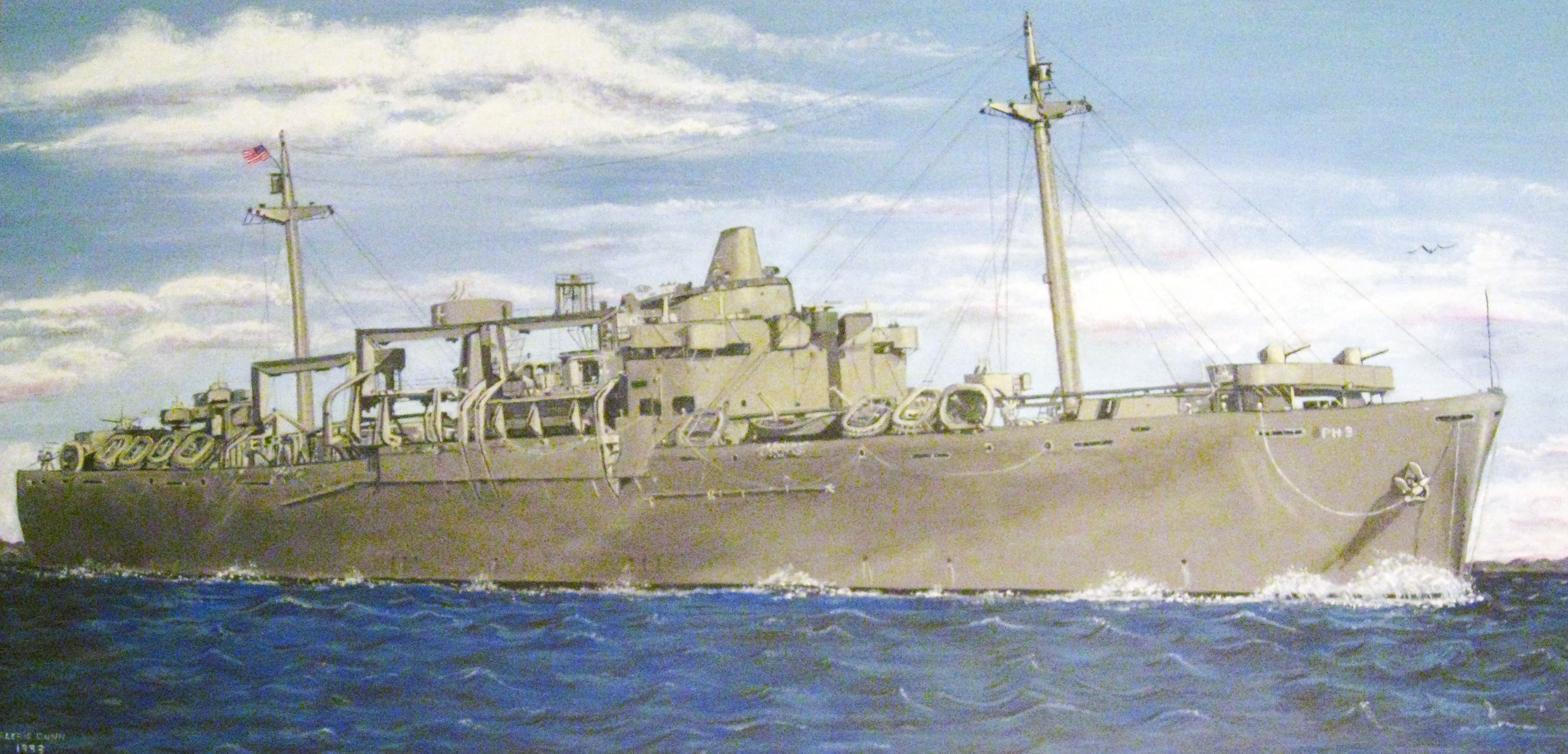
- USS Rixey

History

United States
- Namesake: Presley Marion Rixey, Surgeon General, USN
- Builder: Moore Dry Dock Co., Oakland, Calif.
- Laid down: 6 August 1941
- Launched: 30 December 1941
- Commissioned: 30 December 1942
- Decommissioned: 27 March 1946
- Renamed: USNS Private William H. Thomas 1949
- Home port: San Francisco Bay
- Nickname(s): "The Lucky Ship" (unofficial)
- Honors and awards: 4 battle stars
- Fate: Scrapped 28 August 1970

General characteristics
- Displacement: 7,100 tons (lt.) 11,500 tons (fl.)
- Length: 450 ft (140 m)
- Beam: 62 ft (19 m)
- Draft: 23 ft 6 in (7.16 m)
- Propulsion: Steam turbine, 1 shaft, 8,500 hp
- Speed: 18 knots
- Capacity: 1,166 troops
- Complement: 460
- Armament: 1 5"/38 dual purpose gun; 12 40 mm guns
- Armor: C2-S1-A1 hull

USS Rixey (APH-3) was a casualty evacuation transport ship in the United States Navy during World War II.

Rixey was built by the Moore Dry Dock Company, Oakland, California. 11,500 tons. 450 x 62 x 23.6. 18 knots. Her keel was laid as Alcoa Cruiser (MC Hull 177) 3 June 1941 and intended for use as a bauxite and passenger ship for the Alcoa Steamship Company.

Rixey was launched on 30 December 1941; sponsored by Miss Betty Hammond, and designated for Navy use and assigned the name Rixey after the attack on Pearl Harbor. Acquired by the Navy 30 December 1942; and commissioned the same day. With a complement of 460, and a troop capacity of 1,166 or a bed capacity of 700, Rixey was named in honor of Rear Admiral Presley Marion Rixey, MC, USN.

Rixey saw much combat throughout its deployment in the Second World War. Unlike traditional hospital ships, the Rixey was fitted with weapons for her defense; this allowed her to operate just off of the beaches where Marines engaged Japanese forces. The Rixey's ability to be in harm's way gave wounded troops more expedient access to medical care.

Decommissioned 27 March 1946 after three years and three months active commission; returned to the Maritime Commission and simultaneously transferred to the Army Transportation Service on 9 September 1946. Converted to a transport ship and renamed Private William H. Thomas on 31 October 1947. Following the establishment of a unified sea transportation service, she was returned to the Navy on 1 March 1950 and designated T-AP-185. Transferred to the Maritime Administration's National Defense Reserve Fleet, Rixey was struck from the Naval Vessel Register on 27 December 1957. She was later sold to the Tung Ho Enterprise Corporation, Taiwan.

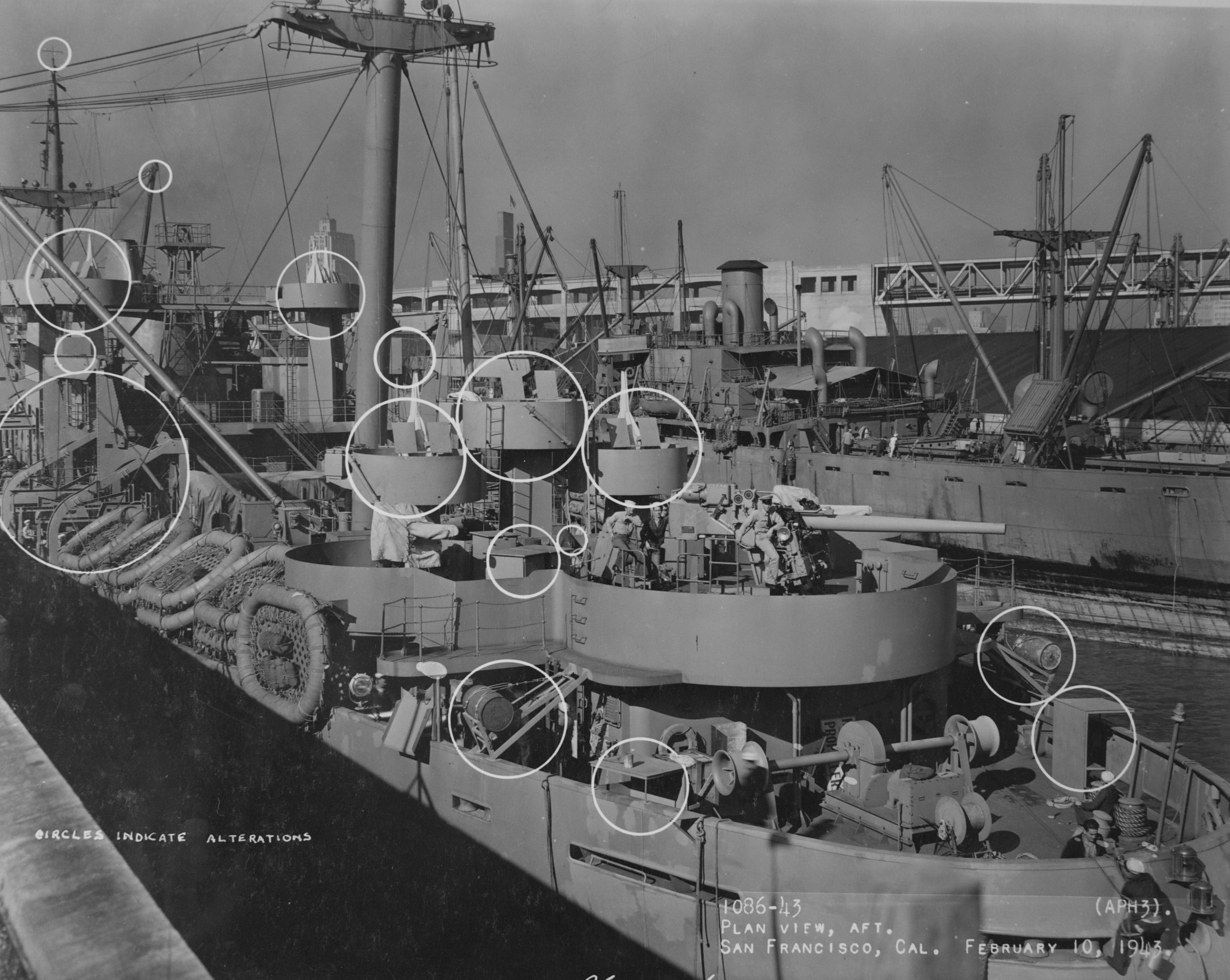
USS Rixey (APH-3)

As the USNS Private William H. Thomas, Rixey aided in the rescue of passengers from the stricken SS Andrea Doria which subsequently sank. The Thomas was the second ship to arrive at the rescue and took command of the rescue operations until the arrival of the Ile De France several hours later.

== See also ==
- Evacuation transport
