= Ninian Pinkney =

American physician (1811–1877)

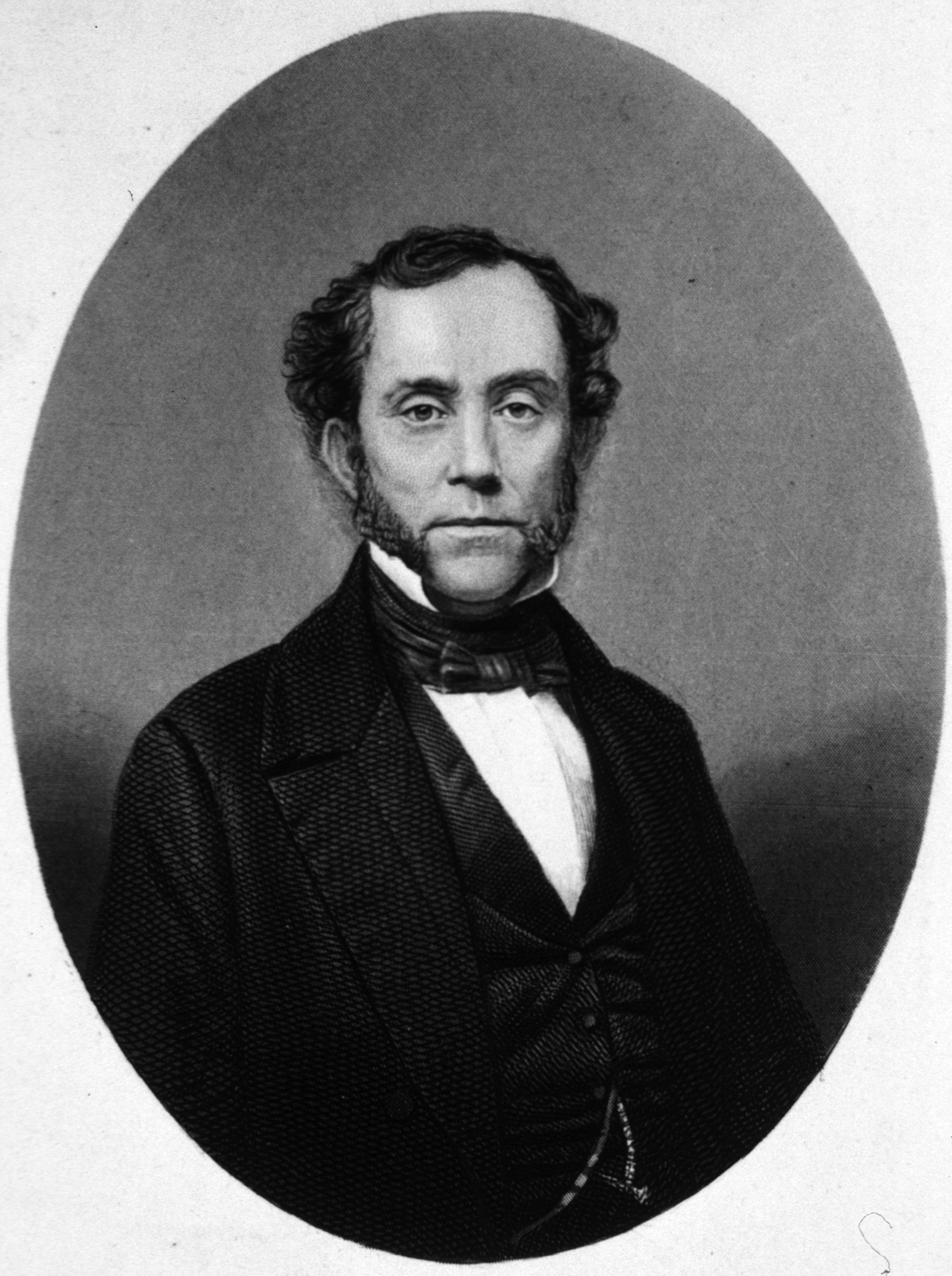
- Ninian Pinkney, Fleet Surgeon, Mississippi Squadron, photographed at St. Louis, Missouri, c. 1864
- Born: 17 June 1811; Annapolis, Maryland, U.S.
- Died: 15 December 1877 (aged 66); Easton, Maryland, U.S.
- Military career
- Allegiance: United States of America; Union
- Branch: United States Navy; Union Navy
- Service years: 1834–1873
- Rank: Medical Director
- Conflicts: American Civil War
- Awards: doctor of laws degree from his alma mater, St. John's College

Ninian Pinkney, also spelled Pinckney (17 June 1811 – 15 December 1877), was a United States Navy surgeon and medical director. He graduated from St. John's College, Annapolis, Maryland, in 1829, and from Jefferson Medical College, Philadelphia, Pennsylvania, in 1833. He spent his entire naval career helping to further develop the field of surgery and medicine. He was especially prominent—and praised—during the American Civil War.

== Military service ==
Appointed an assistant surgeon in the United States Navy on 26 March 1834, Pinkney received orders to the sloop of war Erie on 5 May. Ordered to report by 20 June, he joined the ship at Boston, Massachusetts, on 24 June, shortly before she sailed for the Brazil Station. Detached from Erie on 18 September 1837, he began two months of leave on 20 September, later changed to "waiting orders." Ordered to duty at the Naval Asylum at Philadelphia, Pennsylvania, on 9 April 1838, he was detached from that duty on 2 April 1839, receiving one month of leave. He then joined the frigate Brandywine, assigned to the Mediterranean Squadron, on 17 August, shortly after she was recommissioned.

On 12 February 1840, Commodore Isaac Hull, commanding the squadron, ordered Pinkney to return to the United States, and the assistant surgeon reported his arrival on 24 April. Ordered thence, on 12 October 1840, to the storeship Relief, on the Pacific Squadron, Pinkney later served again on board Erie. He was promoted to surgeon on 27 October 1841.

Commodore Alexander J. Dallas, commanding the Pacific Squadron, granted Surgeon Pinkney permission to return to the United States in February 1844, and he arrived there in April of the same year. Ordered to the Receiving Ship and Naval Station, Baltimore, Maryland, on 24 June 1844, he received orders to "discharge duties" at the Naval Rendezvous (recruiting station) as well, on 21 April 1845.

Detached from the Baltimore Station on 19 September 1846 and placed in the status of "waiting orders," Pinkney was ordered to Albany on 14 October; he reported to that new sloop of war, assigned to the Home Squadron, a little less than a fortnight later, on 27 October. Transferred to sloop of war Germantown, also in the Home Squadron, three days after Christmas the following year 28 December 1847, he was detached from that ship on 23 February 1848. Carried on the status of "waiting orders" on 1 January of the following year [1849], Pinkney was ordered to the new sidewheel sloop of war Saranac on 4 February 1850, to report for duty on the 24th of that month. Detached from that ship on 22 July 1851, the surgeon was then ordered [10 September] to review candidates for admission to the U.S. Naval Academy. Following another period of "waiting orders," he was ordered to the Naval Academy on 3 April 1852.

Detached from the Academy on 5 July 1855, Pinkney subsequently received orders to the sidewheel frigate Susquehanna on 31 March 1856, and served in that ship as she cruised in the Mediterranean and off the coast of Central America, and later operated in assistance of the steam frigate Niagara in her unsuccessful attempt to lay the Atlantic Cable in August 1857. Detached from Susquehanna on 19 April 1858, he was ordered to the U.S. Naval Hospital at Norfolk, Virginia, on 21 October, his actual time of reporting delayed from 1 November to 1 December 1858. Detached from that medical facility ashore on 9 June 1859, Pinkney received orders to join the screw frigate San Jacinto as she prepared for a cruise to the coast of Africa.

Illness, however, shortened Pinkney's tour of duty in San Jacinto, as he was detached from the ship at Cádiz, Spain, and ordered home "because of ill health" on 28 March 1860. Arriving back in the United States on 23 April, he went to Easton, Maryland, where he apparently remained until he was ordered to special duty in Washington, D.C., on 8 June 1861. Detached from duty in the capitol on 12 December 1861, he received orders to report as the Fleet Surgeon, Mississippi Squadron, on the last day 1861.

== Civil War service ==
Pinkney served in the Mississippi Squadron for the duration of the American Civil War, performing "the most arduous duty in caring for the sick and wounded." He succeeded in getting possession of the Commercial Hotel, in Memphis, Tennessee, a building "admirably located and well adapted for hospital purposes" in March 1863. The shortage of assistant surgeons compelled Pinkney to serve on board the U.S. Navy Hospital Ship Red Rover, "where he has been of great service fitting out his department." Acting Rear-Admiral David Dixon Porter, Commanding the Mississippi Squadron, called Pinkney's presence

absolutely necessary...many cases occurring where his great experience as a surgeon enabled him to save life in more than one instance.

Porter used the occasion to dispel any misgivings about the fleet surgeon's "little peculiarities" (Pinkney was known to be of "a 'peppery' nature and stood firmly on his dignity and rights"), writing to Secretary of the Navy Gideon Welles on 30 March 1863 of Pinkney that "...a more zealous, devoted officer to the profession, and to the country, does not exist anywhere..."

Soon thereafter, the fleet surgeon directed the provision of new ships fitting out at St. Louis, Missouri, and Cincinnati, Ohio, with medical stores during June, 1863, and later that summer supervised the conversion of a seized Confederate building at Memphis, Tennessee, into a hospital.

Pinkney received the wounded from the fall of Fort Pillow in April 1864, on board the Hospital Ship Red Rover, and treated them. Subsequently, one of the nursing sisters, employed on board Red Rover, wrote to express her appreciation for the kindness Pinkney had extended to them. "Through them," Sister Angela, of the Order of the Holy Cross, wrote on 11 August 1864, "I have learned to know and esteem Dr. Pinkney as one of the best and most cherished of the noble corps comprising the Navy".

== Post-Civil War service ==
Commodore Pinkney retired from active duty on 15 June 1865. Over the next four years (until 8 November 1869), performed a succession of duties, serving as a member of the Board of Visitors of the U.S. Naval Academy, presided over the board that examined candidates for admission to the Academy, and served as a delegate to represent the Medical Department of the Navy to the Medical Department in England. Ordered to duty at Washington, D.C., on 1 October 1870, he was promoted to the rank of Medical Director on 3 March 1871.

== Final years ==
Detached from the Washington Navy Yard and retired with that rank on 7 June 1873, Pinkney, who received a doctor of laws degree from his alma mater, St. John's College, Annapolis, in 1873. He died after a brief illness at his residence, "Londonderry," near Easton, Maryland, on 15 December 1877.

== Honor ==
The United States Navy ship USS Pinkney, which saw action in the Pacific theater during World War II, was named in his honor.
