= USS Pinkney =

1941 Tryon-class evacuation transport

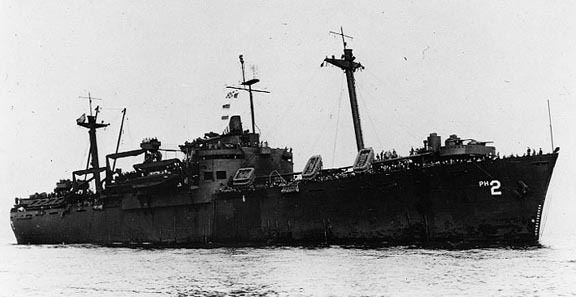
- USS Pinkney (APH-2)

History

United States
- Name: USS Pinkney
- Namesake: Ninian Pinkney, who developed the field of surgery and medicine for the U.S. Navy.
- Ordered: As Type C2-S1-A1 hull, MC hull 176
- Builder: Moore Dry Dock Co., Oakland, California
- Laid down: 3 June 1941, as SS Alcoa Corsair
- Launched: 4 December 1941
- Sponsored by: Miss Ruth Grove of Berkeley, California
- Acquired: By the Navy, 27 November 1942 and on 1 March 1950
- Commissioned: 27 November 1942 as USS Pinkney (APH-2)
- Decommissioned: 9 September 1946
- In service: 1947 as USAT Private Elden H. Johnson
- Out of service: 1950
- Refit: Converted to a transport at Puget Sound Shipbuilding and Dry Dock Company for the U.S. Army
- Stricken: 27 December 1957
- Honors and awards: Six battle stars during World War II
- Fate: Scrapped, 28 September 1970
- Notes: Returned to service as USNS Private Elden H Johnson (T-AP-184) on 1 March 1950; removed from service on 26 December 1957.

General characteristics
- Class & type: Tryon-class evacuation transport
- Displacement: 7,100 long tons (7,214 t) light; 11,500 long tons (11,685 t) full load
- Length: 450 ft 2 in (137.21 m)
- Beam: 62 ft (19 m)
- Draft: 25 ft 7 in (7.80 m) (max)
- Propulsion: Steam turbine, single shaft, 8,500 hp (6,338 kW)
- Speed: 18 knots (33 km/h; 21 mph)
- Troops: 1,166
- Complement: 460 officers and enlisted
- Armament: 1 × single 5"/38 dual purpose gun; 12 × single 40 mm AA guns; 8 × 20 mm AA guns

USS Pinkney (APH-2) was a Tryon-class evacuation transport that was assigned to the U.S. Navy during World War II. Pinkney served in the Pacific Ocean theatre of operations and returned home safely post-war with six battle stars but missing 18 crew members who were killed in action.

In 1947 she was acquired by the U.S. Army who renamed her USAT Pvt. Elden H. Johnson and retained her in Army service until 1950 when she was returned to the Navy and assigned to the Military Sea Transportation Service (MSTS) as USNS Pvt. Elden H Johnson (T-AP-184).

== Built in Oakland, California ==
USS Pinkney (APH-2) was laid down as Alcoa Corsair (MC hull 176), 3 June 1941, by the Moore Dry Dock Co., Oakland, California; launched 4 December 1941; sponsored by Miss Ruth Grove; designated for U.S. Navy use and assigned the name Mercy. After the bombing of Pearl Harbor, she was renamed Pinkney, 13 August 1942; acquired, by the U.S. Navy, 27 November 1942; and commissioned the same day.

== World War II Pacific Theatre Operations ==
Following extensive fitting out and shakedown, USS Pinkney, an Evacuation Transport, departed San Diego, California, for Pearl Harbor and the South Pacific Ocean, 27 January 1943. In mid-February, she arrived at Espiritu Santo, whence she sailed to Purvis Bay to deliver reinforcements and replacements to the veteran units of the fight for Tulagi and Gavutu.

Throughout the remaining battles for the Solomon Islands, among them Munda, Vella Lavella, Shortlands, Bougainville, and the numerous engagements in the "Slot", she brought men, food and ammunition forward and evacuated casualties from field hospitals to better facilities on New Caledonia and in New Zealand. She also transported American and New Zealand nurses to and between various southwest Pacific Ocean hospitals.

By August 1944, island hopping had carried the Allies to and past the Marshall Islands and Mariana Islands. On 8 September, USS Pinkney departed Guadalcanal for the Palaus, the next group en route to the Philippine Islands. On the 15th, she delivered her passengers, men of the 1st Marine Regiment, to LVTs, which took them on to the beaches at Peleliu. She then took up position 6,000 yards off the assault area to expedite offloading of equipment and embarkation of casualties. On the 20th she sailed for Manus Island, whence she returned to the Palaus, again and again, to evacuate the wounded.

=== Invasion of the Philippines ===
In early October, she returned briefly to the Solomon Islands, then sailed for Hollandia, then the Philippines. Into November, she evacuated Leyte casualties to Hollandia, Mantis, and New Caledonia. In December, she prepared for the Luzon invasion. On 9 January 1945, she landed Army troops on the Lingayen beaches, and, once again, assumed responsibilities for the care and evacuation of casualties, this time to Leyte.

In late February, while en route to the Solomons, she was diverted to Guam, thence to Iwo Jima. On the 28th, she returned to Guam, disembarked her patients and began preparations for her last campaign, Okinawa.

=== Okinawa operations ===
On 1–2 April, USS Pinkney participated in the feints against southern Okinawa, then shifted to the Hagushi assault area where she landed U.S. Marine combatant and hospital units on the 10th. Casualties, from ships and from ashore, were soon filling her hospital wards. Caring for patients and expediting transferral of others to the hospital ship USS Samaritan, she dodged enemy shells and kamikazes until the 28th.

=== Struck by a kamikaze ===
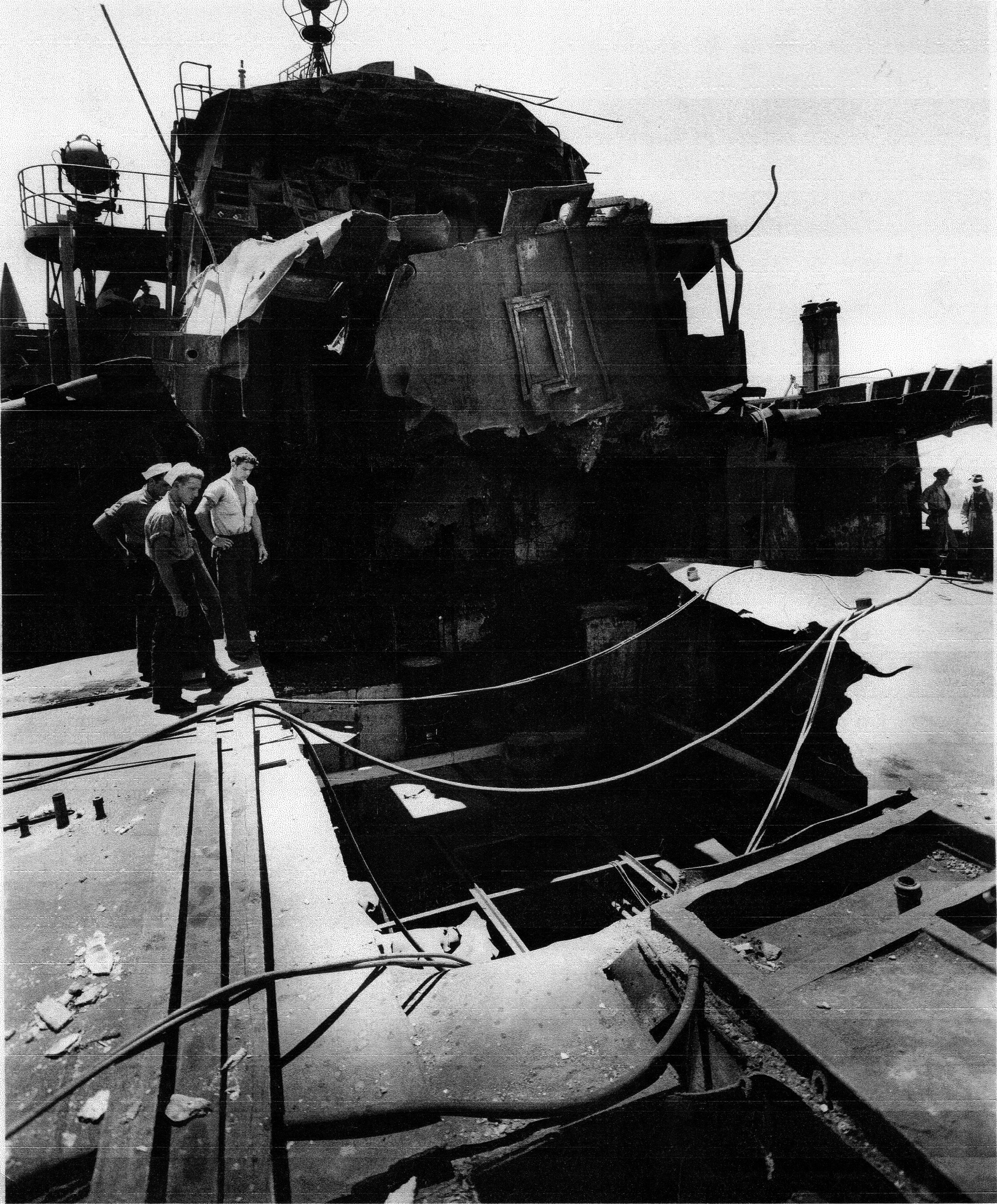
Viewing the damage, with electrical cables and hoses from support ships across the hole.

On that day, at 1730, a low-flying kamikaze was spotted closing the ship. Seconds later USS Pinkney was rocked by an explosion and the after-end of the superstructure was walled by a sheet of flame. Ammunition began to explode. Water lines, electrical conduits, and steam pipes ruptured. The crew immediately formed rescue and damage control parties. Live ammunition was thrown overboard. All but 16 patients, killed in the initial explosion, were transferred to safety.

Rescue tugs and landing craft moved in to assist in fire fighting, but the flames continued for another three hours, by which time USS Pinkney had lost 18 of her crew and had taken on a heavy list to port. A jagged hole, 30 feet in diameter, extended from the bridge deck to the bulkhead deck. All wards in the amidships hospital area were burned out.

=== Return to Stateside for repairs ===
Temporary repairs took 8 days. On 9 May, USS Pinkney got underway for Saipan en route to the United States. She arrived at San Francisco, California, 8 June, and underwent repairs.

https://commons.wikimedia.org/wiki/File:USS_Pinkney_(APH%E2%80%912)_original.jpg

https://commons.wikimedia.org/wiki/File:USS_Pinkney_(APH%E2%80%912)_Ai_enhanced.png

== Post-War operations ==
On 21 October, sailed for the Far East again, this time to carry replacements and occupation troops to Tokyo and Sasebo and return with veterans. By February 1946, she had completed another U.S. West Coast—Far East run. Inactivation followed and on 9 September she was returned to the U.S. Maritime Commission and simultaneously transferred to the Army Transportation Service.

== Conversion to U.S. Army use ==
Converted to an AP by the Puget Sound Shipbuilding and Dry Dock Co., and renamed USAT Pvt. Elden H. Johnson, 31 October 1947, she remained with the Army Transportation Service (ATS) until returned to the U.S. Maritime Commission, thence to the U.S. Navy, 1 March 1950.

== Conversion to MSTS use ==
Designated AP–184, she joined the newly formed Military Sea Transportation Service (MSTS) and was assigned a civil service crew. As an MSTS vessel, she plied the same waters, Atlantic Ocean–Mediterranean–Adriatic Sea, as she had under ATS until mid-1951, when runs to Caribbean ports were added to her schedule.

== Final decommissioning ==
As USNS Pvt. Elden H. Johnson (T-AP-184) she continued to serve the U.S. Navy until 1957. On 27 December, she was transferred to the Maritime Administration's National Defense Reserve Fleet and her name was struck from the Navy List. Into 1970, she remained with the NDRF, berthed with the Hudson River group.

Final Disposition: scrapped in 1971

== Honors and awards ==
USS Pinkney (APH–2) earned six battle stars during World War II:

Consolidation of Solomon Islands – Consolidation of southern Solomon Islands, 8 February to 20 June 1943
Western Caroline Islands operation – Capture and occupation of southern Palau Islands, 15–20 September 1944
Leyte operation – Leyte landings, San Pedro Bay, 30 October to 3 November 1944
Luzon operation – Lingayen Gulf landings, 9 January and 2 February 1945
Iwo Jima operation – Assault and occupation of Iwo Jima, 24–26 February 1945
Okinawa Gunto operation – Assault and occupation of Okinawa Gunto, 1 April to 8 May 1945

Qualified on-board personnel were authorized the following:

Combat Action Ribbon (retroactive 28 April 1945 – Okinawa)
American Campaign Medal
Asiatic-Pacific Campaign Medal (6)
World War II Victory Medal
Navy Occupation Service Medal (with Asia clasp)
Philippine Liberation Medal

Also awarded:

Purple Heart (18-KIA, 28 April 1945 – Okinawa)

== See also ==
- Evacuation transport
