= Evacuation transport =

An Evacuation Transport is a vessel type employed by the U.S. Navy. Its designation is APH, and the vessel is used to evacuate personnel, principally the wounded.

== Evacuation transports ==
- USS Tryon (APH-1)
- USS Pinkney (APH-2)
- USS Rixey (APH-3)
