= USS Pennsylvania (BB-38) =

Dreadnought battleship of the United States Navy

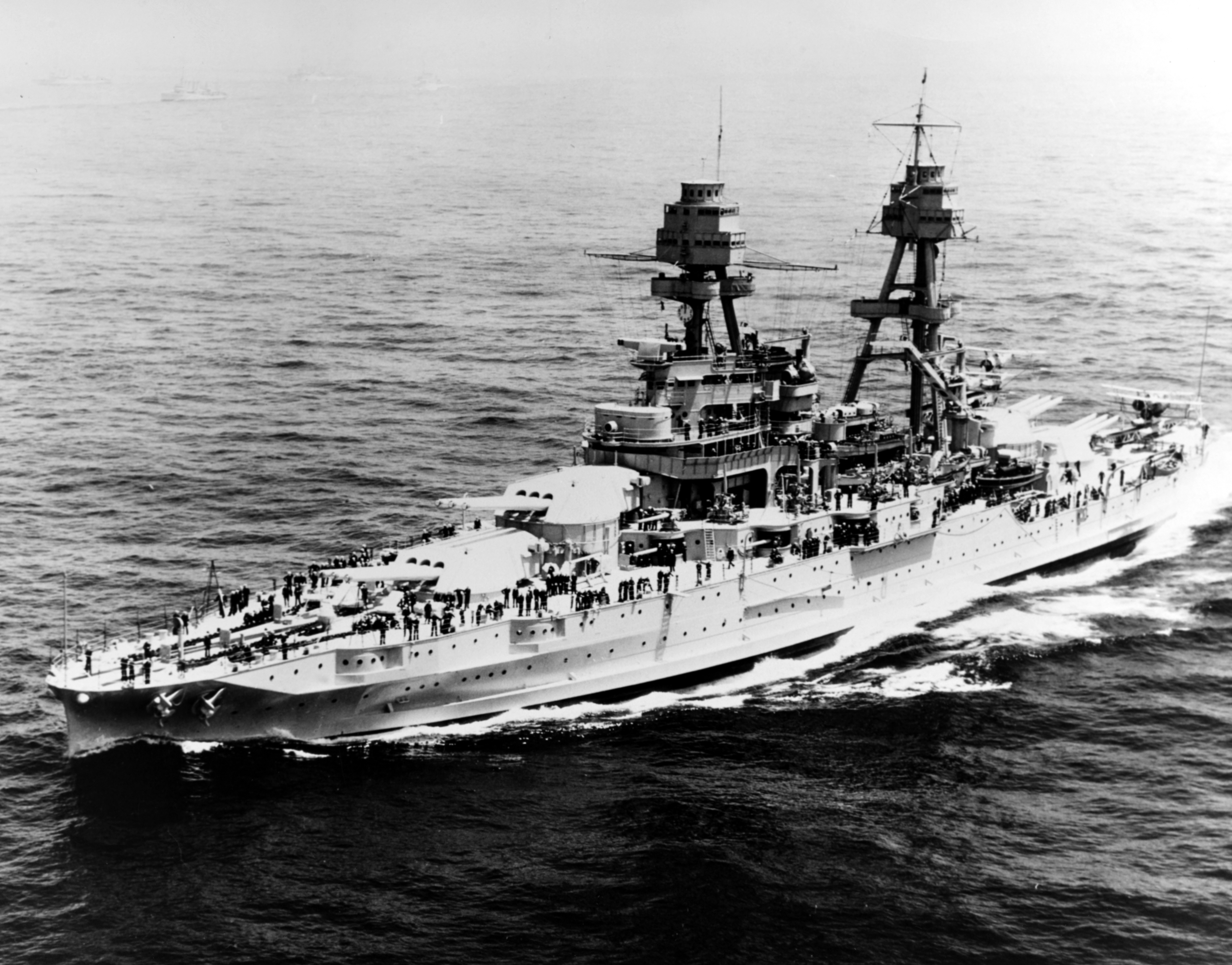
- USS Pennsylvania under way off New York City on 31 May 1934

History

United States
- Name: Pennsylvania
- Namesake: Pennsylvania
- Ordered: 22 August 1912
- Builder: Newport News Shipbuilding and Drydock Company
- Laid down: 27 October 1913
- Launched: 16 March 1915
- Commissioned: 12 June 1916
- Decommissioned: 29 August 1946
- Stricken: 19 February 1948
- Fate: Scuttled off Kwajalein Atoll after Operation Crossroads on 10 February 1948

General characteristics (as built)
- Class & type: Pennsylvania-class battleship
- Displacement: Full load: 31,917 long tons (32,429 t)
- Length: 608 ft (185 m)
- Beam: 97.1 ft (29.6 m)
- Draft: 28.9 ft (8.8 m)
- Installed power: 12 × Babcock & Wilcox water-tube boilers; 34,000 shp (25,000 kW)
- Propulsion: 4 × Curtis ungeared/Westinghouse steam turbines; 4 × screw propellers
- Speed: 21 kn (24 mph; 39 km/h)
- Range: 7,552 nmi (8,691 mi; 13,986 km) at 12 kn (14 mph; 22 km/h)
- Capacity: Fuel oil: 2,305 long tons (2,342 t)
- Complement: 56 officers; 72 Marines; 1,031 enlisted men
- Armament: 12 × 14 in (356 mm)/45 cal guns (4×3); 22 × 5 in (127 mm)/51 cal guns; 4 × 3 in (76 mm)/50 cal anti-aircraft guns; 2 × submerged 21 inch (533 mm) torpedo tubes
- Armor: Belt: 13.5 in (340 mm); Deck: 3 in (76 mm) (ends); Turrets: 18 in (460 mm) (faces); Conning Tower: 16 in (410 mm)
- Aircraft carried: 2 × floatplanes
- Aviation facilities: 2 × catapults

General characteristics (1931)
- Displacement: Standard: 34,400 long tons (34,952 t); Full load: 39,224 long tons (39,853 t)
- Installed power: 6 × Bureau Express boilers
- Armament: 12 × 14"/45 cal guns (4×3); 12 × 5"/51 cal guns; 8 × 5"/25 cal anti-aircraft guns; 8 × .50-cal M2 Browning machine guns

General characteristics (1942)
- Sensors & processing systems: CXAM-1 radar
- Armament: 12 × 14"/45 cal guns (4×3); 16 × 5"/38 cal guns; 40 × 40 mm (1.6 in) Bofors guns; 51 × 20 mm (0.79 in) Oerlikon guns

USS Pennsylvania, hull number BB-38, was the lead ship of the Pennsylvania class of super-dreadnought battleships built for the United States Navy in the 1910s. The Pennsylvanias were part of the standard-type battleship series, and marked an incremental improvement over the preceding Nevada class, carrying an extra pair of 14-inch (356 mm) guns for a total of twelve guns. Named for the Commonwealth of Pennsylvania, she was laid down at the Newport News Shipbuilding and Drydock Company in October 1913, was launched in March 1915, and was commissioned in June 1916. Equipped with an oil-burning propulsion system, Pennsylvania was not sent to European waters during World War I, since the necessary fuel oil was not as readily available as coal. Instead, she remained in American waters and took part in training exercises; in 1918, she escorted President Woodrow Wilson to France to take part in peace negotiations.

During the 1920s and 1930s, Pennsylvania served as the flagship of first the Atlantic Fleet, and after it was merged with the Pacific Fleet in 1921, the Battle Fleet. For the majority of this period, the ship was stationed in California, based in San Pedro. Pennsylvania was occupied with a peacetime routine of training exercises (including the annual Fleet problems), port visits, and foreign cruises, including a visit to Australia in 1925. The ship was modernized in 1929–1931. The ship was present in Pearl Harbor on the morning of 7 December 1941; she was in drydock with a pair of destroyers when the Japanese launched their surprise attack on the port. She suffered relatively minor damage in the attack, being protected from torpedoes by the drydock. While repairs were effected, the ship received a modernized anti-aircraft battery to prepare her for operations in the Pacific War.

Pennsylvania joined the fleet in a series of amphibious operations, primarily tasked with providing gunfire support. The first of these, the Aleutian Islands Campaign, took place in mid-1943, and was followed by an attack on Makin later that year. During 1944, she supported the landings on Kwajalein and Eniwetok in the Marshall Islands and the Mariana and Palau Islands campaign, including the Battles of Saipan, Guam, Peleliu, and Battle of Angaur. During the Philippines campaign, in addition to her typical shore bombardment duties, she took part in the Battle of Surigao Strait, though due to her inadequate radar, she was unable to locate a target and did not fire. During the Battle of Okinawa, she was torpedoed by a Japanese torpedo bomber and badly damaged, forcing her to withdraw for repairs days before the end of the war.

Allocated to the target fleet for the Operation Crossroads nuclear tests in 1946, Pennsylvania was repaired only enough to allow her to make the voyage to the test site, Bikini Atoll. She survived both blasts, but was badly contaminated with radioactive fallout from the second test, and so was towed to Kwajalein, where she was studied for the next year and a half. The ship was ultimately scuttled in deep water off the atoll in February 1948.

== Description ==
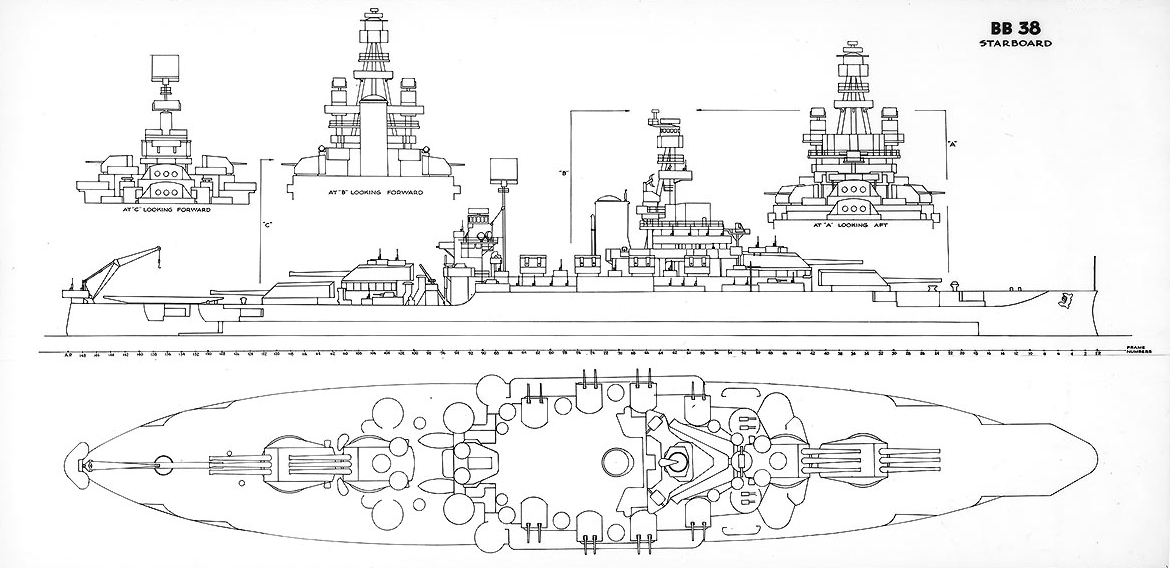
Line drawing of Pennsylvania as she appeared following her 1942 reconstruction

Part of the standard-type battleship series, the Pennsylvania-class ships were significantly larger than their predecessors, the Nevada class. Pennsylvania had an overall length of 608 feet (185 m), a beam of 97 feet (30 m) (at the waterline), and a draft of 29 feet 3 inches (8.92 m) at deep load. This was 25 feet (7.6 m) longer than the older ships. She displaced 29,158 long tons (29,626 t) at standard and 31,917 long tons (32,429 t) at deep load, over 4,000 long tons (4,060 t) more than the older ships. The ship had a metacentric height of 7.82 feet (2.38 m) at deep load.

The ship had four direct-drive Curtis steam turbine sets, each of which drove a propeller 12 feet 1.5 inches (3.7 m) in diameter. They were powered by twelve Babcock & Wilcox water-tube boilers. The turbines were designed to produce a total of 34,000 shaft horsepower (25,000 kW), for a designed speed of 21 knots (39 km/h; 24 mph). She was designed to normally carry 1,548 long tons (1,573 t) of fuel oil, but had a maximum capacity of 2,305 long tons (2,342 t). At full capacity, the ship could steam at a speed of 12 knots (22 km/h; 14 mph) for an estimated 7,552 nautical miles (13,990 km; 8,690 mi) with a clean bottom. She had four 300-kilowatt (402 hp) turbo generators.

Fitting-out deck area around forward turrets in early weeks of 1916

Pennsylvania carried twelve 45-caliber 14 in (356 mm) guns in triple gun turrets. The turrets were numbered from I to IV from front to rear. The guns could not elevate independently and were limited to a maximum elevation of +15° which gave them a maximum range of 21,000 yards (19,000 m). The ship carried 100 shells for each gun. Defense against torpedo boats was provided by twenty-two 51-caliber 5 in (127 mm) guns mounted in individual casemates in the sides of the ship's hull. Positioned as they were they proved vulnerable to sea spray and could not be worked in heavy seas. At an elevation of 15°, they had a maximum range of 14,050 yards (12,850 m). Each gun was provided with 230 rounds of ammunition. The ship mounted four 50-caliber three-inch guns for anti-aircraft defense, although only two were fitted when completed. The other pair were added shortly afterward on top of Turret III. Pennsylvania also mounted two 21-inch (533 mm) torpedo tubes submerged, one on each broadside, and carried 24 torpedoes for them.

The Pennsylvania-class design continued the all-or-nothing principle of armoring only the most important areas of the ship begun in the Nevada class. The waterline armor belt of Krupp armor measured 13.5 inches (343 mm) thick and covered only the ship's machinery spaces and magazines. It had a total height of 17 feet 6 inches (5.3 m), of which 8 feet 9.75 inches (2.7 m) was below the waterline; beginning 2 feet 4 inches (0.7 m) below the waterline, the belt tapered to its minimum thickness of 8 inches (203 mm). The transverse bulkheads at each end of the ship ranged from 13 to 8 inches in thickness. The faces of the gun turrets were 18 inches (457 mm) thick while the sides were 9–10 inches (229–254 mm) thick and the turret roofs were protected by 5 inches (127 mm) of armor. The armor of the barbettes was 18 to 4.5 inches (457 to 114 mm) thick. The conning tower was protected by 16 inches (406 mm) of armor and had a roof eight inches thick.

The main armor deck was three plates thick with a total thickness of 3 inches (76 mm); over the steering gear the armor increased to 6.25 inches (159 mm) in two plates. Beneath it was the splinter deck that ranged from 1.5 to 2 inches (38 to 51 mm) in thickness. The boiler uptakes were protected by a conical mantlet that ranged from 9 to 15 inches (230 to 380 mm) in thickness. A three-inch torpedo bulkhead was placed 9 feet 6 inches (2.9 m) inboard from the ship's side and the ship was provided with a complete double bottom. Testing in mid-1914 revealed that this system could withstand 300 pounds (140 kg) of TNT.

== Service history ==
=== Construction and World War I ===
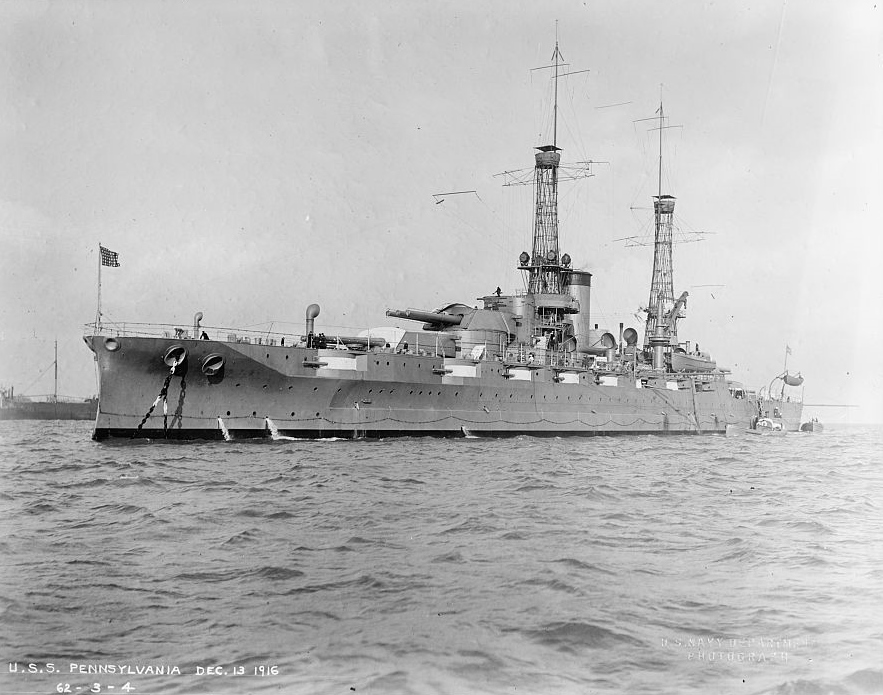
Pennsylvania in her original configuration, December 1916

The keel for Pennsylvania was laid down on 27 October 1913 at the Newport News Shipbuilding and Dry Dock Company of Newport News, Virginia. Her completed hull was launched on 16 March 1915, thereafter beginning fitting-out. Work on the ship finished in mid-1916, and she was commissioned on 12 June under the command of Captain Henry B. Wilson. The ship was assigned to the Atlantic Fleet and then completed final fitting out from 1 to 20 July. Pennsylvania then began sea trials in 20 July, steaming first to the southern drill grounds off the Virginia Capes and then north to the coast of New England. Rear Admiral Austin M. Knight and officers from the Naval War College came aboard on 21 August to observe fleet training exercises. Three days later, the ship was visited by Franklin Delano Roosevelt, then the Assistant Secretary of the Navy.

Rear Admiral Henry T. Mayo transferred to Pennsylvania on 12 October, making her the flagship of the Atlantic Fleet. At the end of the year, she went into drydock at the New York Navy Yard for maintenance. After emerging from the shipyard in January 1917, she steamed south to join fleet exercises in the Caribbean Sea, during which she stopped in: Culebra, Puerto Rico; Santo Domingo, Dominican Republic; and Port-au-Prince, Haiti. While in Port-au-Prince, Pennsylvania again hosted Roosevelt, who met with the president of Haiti aboard the ship. The battleship arrived back in Yorktown, Virginia on 6 April, the same day the United States declared war on Germany, bringing the country into World War I. Since Pennsylvania was oil-fired, she did not join the ships of Battleship Division Nine, as the British had asked for coal-burning battleships to reinforce the Grand Fleet. As a result, she stayed in American waters and saw no action during the war.

In August, Pennsylvania took part in a naval review for President Woodrow Wilson. Foreign naval officers visited the ship in September, including the Japanese Vice Admiral Isamu Takeshita and the Russian Vice Admiral Alexander Kolchak. For the rest of the year and into 1918, Pennsylvania was kept in a state of readiness through fleet exercises and gunnery training in Chesapeake Bay and Long Island Sound. She was preparing for night battle training on 11 November 1918, when the Armistice with Germany came into effect, ending the fighting. She thereafter returned for another stint in the New York Navy Yard for maintenance that was completed on 21 November. She began the voyage to Brest, France, on 2 December by way of Tomkinsville, New York, in company with the transport ship George Washington that carried Wilson to France to take part in the peace negotiations; they were escorted by ten destroyers. The ships arrived on 13 December and the next day, Pennsylvania began the trip back to New York with Battleship Divisions Nine and Six. The battleships reached their destination on 26 December, where they took part in victory celebrations.

=== Inter-war period ===
==== 1919–1924 ====
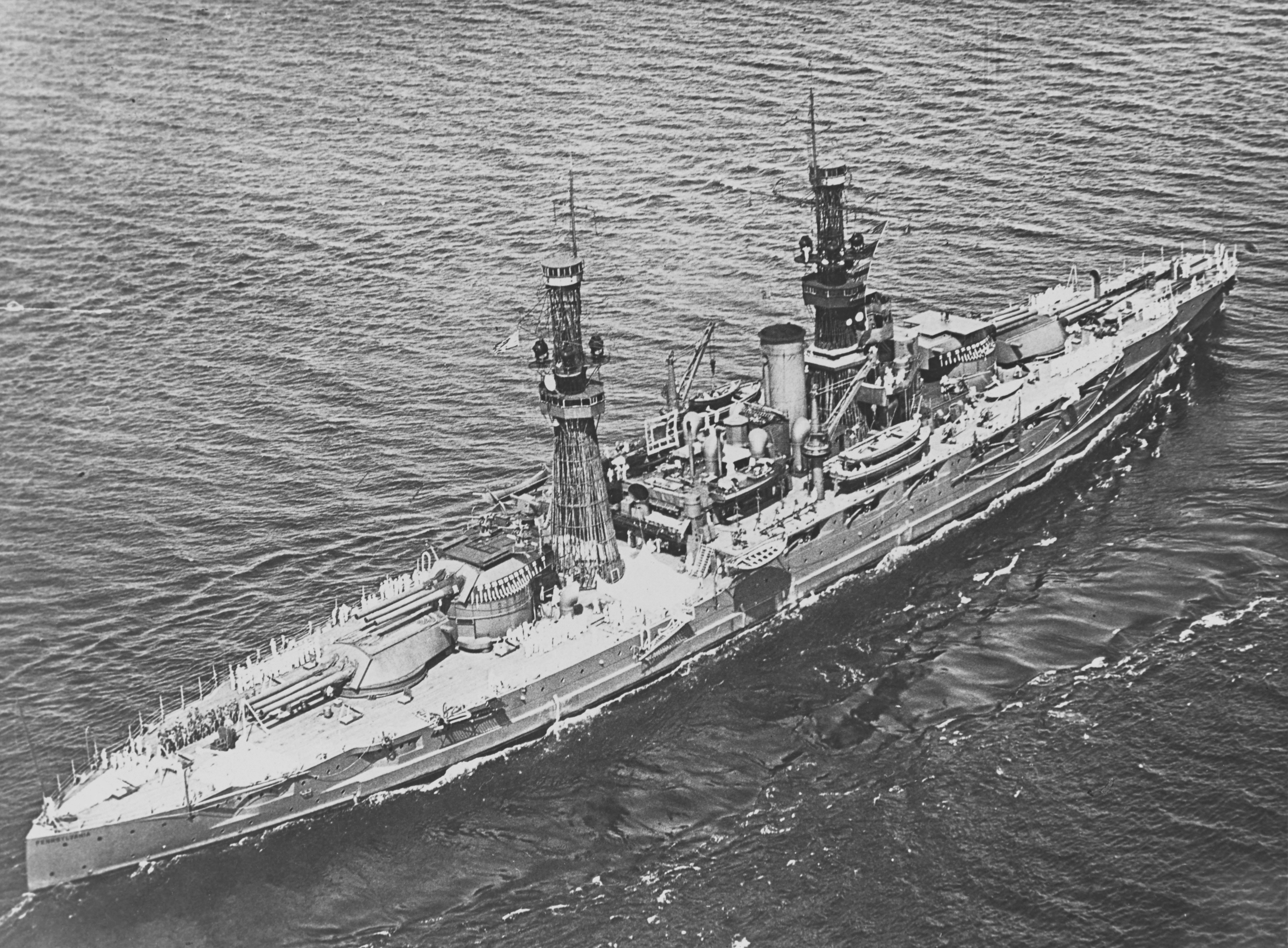
Pennsylvania underway, c. 1920

Pennsylvania and the rest of the Atlantic Fleet departed on 19 February, bound for the Caribbean for another round of exercises in Cuban waters. The ship arrived back in New York on 14 April, and while there on 30 June, Mayo was replaced by Vice Admiral Henry Wilson. On 8 July at Tomkinsville, a delegation consisting of: Vice President Thomas R. Marshall; Josephus Daniels, the Secretary of the Navy; Carter Glass, the Secretary of the Treasury; William B. Wilson, the Secretary of Labor; Newton D. Baker, the Secretary of War; Franklin K. Lane, the Secretary of the Interior; and Senator Champ Clark came aboard the ship for a cruise back to New York. The fleet conducted another set of maneuvers in the Caribbean from 7 January to April 1920, Pennsylvania returning to her berth in New York on 26 April. Training exercises in the area followed, and on 17 July she received the hull number BB-38.

On 17 January 1921, Pennsylvania left New York, passed through the Panama Canal to Balboa, Panama, where she joined the Pacific Fleet, which together with elements of the Atlantic Fleet was re-designated as the Battle Fleet, with Pennsylvania as its flagship. On 21 January, the fleet left Balboa and steamed south to Callao, Peru, where they arrived ten days later. The ships then steamed north back to Balboa on 2 February, arriving on 14 February. Pennsylvania crossed back through the canal to take part in maneuvers off Cuba and on 28 April she arrived in Hampton Roads, Virginia, where President Warren G. Harding, Edwin Denby, the Secretary of the Navy, Theodore Roosevelt Jr., the Assistant Secretary of the Navy, and Admiral Robert Coontz, the Chief of Naval Operations (CNO), came aboard the ship. Further training was held from 12 to 21 July in the Caribbean, after which she returned to New York. On 30 July, she proceeded on to Plymouth, Massachusetts for a visit that lasted until 2 August. Anothery drydock period in New York lasted from 5 to 20 August.

Pennsylvania departed New York thereafter, bound for the Pacific; she passed through the Panama Canal on 30 August and remained at Balboa for two weeks. On 15 September, she resumed the voyage and steamed north to San Pedro, Los Angeles, which she reached on 26 September. The ship spent most of 1922 visiting ports along the US west coast, including San Francisco, Seattle, Port Angeles, and San Diego, and from 6 March to 19 April, she underwent a refit at the Puget Sound Navy Yard. She won the Battle Efficiency Award for the 1922 training year. She went back to Puget Sound on 18 December, and remained there into 1923. She left the shipyard on 28 January and steamed south to San Diego, where she stayed from 2 to 8 February, before continuing on to the Panama Canal. After passing through, she steamed to Culebra for a short visit. The ship then passed back through the canal and arrived back in San Pedro on 13 April. Beginning in May, she visited various ports in the area over the course of the rest of 1923, apart from a round of fleet training from 27 November to 7 December. She ended the year with another stint in Puget Sound from 22 December until 1 March 1924.

==== 1924–1931 ====
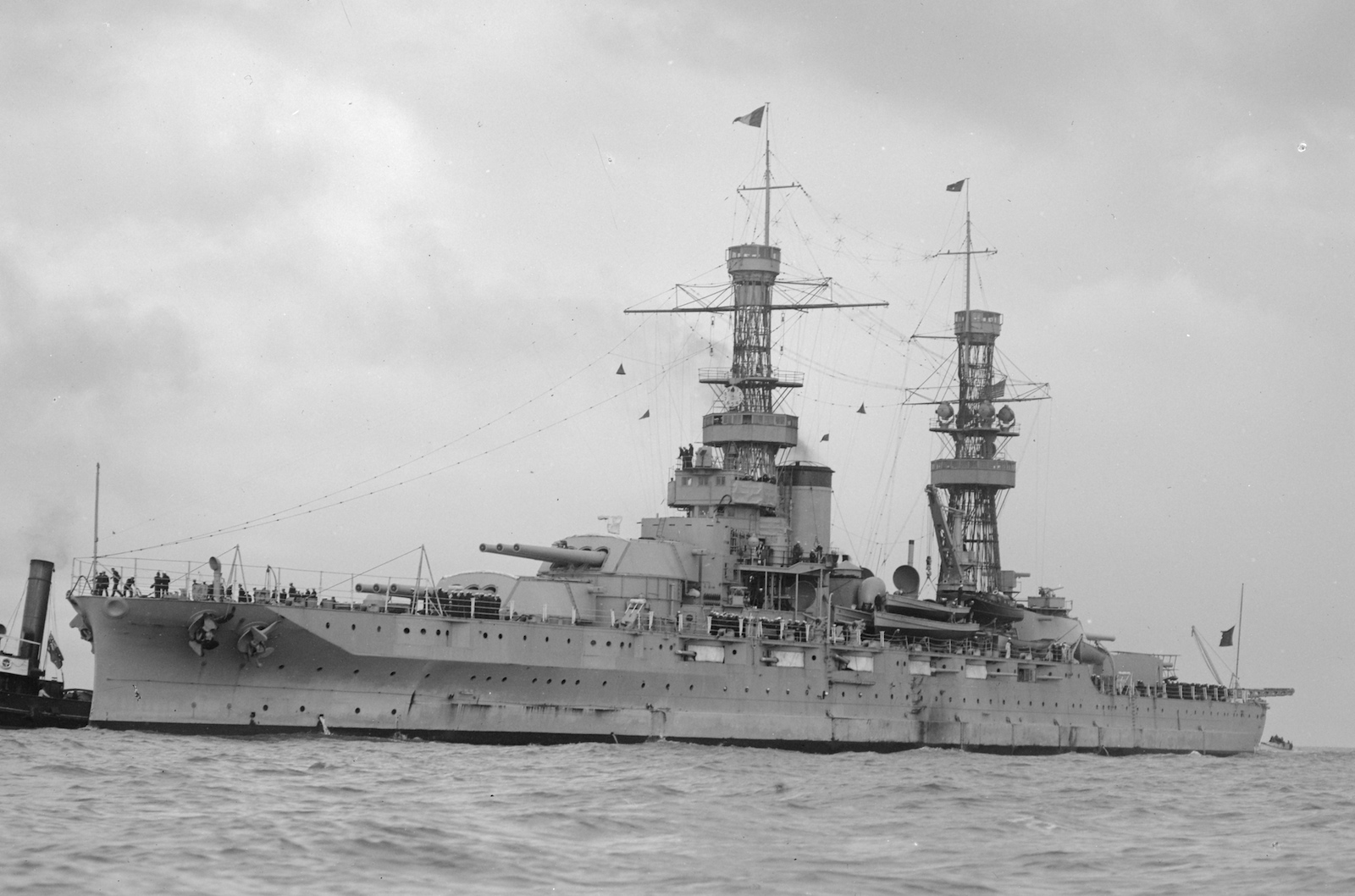
USS Pennsylvania during visit to Australia in 1925

The ship arrived in San Francisco on 3 March, where she loaded ammunition before joining the Battle Fleet in San Diego on 9 March. The fleet cruised south to the Gulf of Fonseca, then continued south and passed through the Panama Canal to Bahía Limón. The ships visited several ports in the Caribbean, including in the US Virgin Islands and Puerto Rico before returning to the Pacific in early April. Pennsylvania arrived back in San Pedro on 22 April, where she remained until 25 June, when she steamed north to Seattle. By this time, she was serving as the flagship of Battle Division 3 of the Battle Fleet. While in the Seattle area, she took part in training exercises with the ships of her division that lasted until 1 September. Further training exercises took place from 12 to 22 September off San Francisco. She thereafter took part in joint training with the coastal defenses around San Francisco from 26 to 29 September. The ship underwent a pair of overhauls from 1 to 13 October and 13 December to 5 January 1925. Pennsylvania then steamed to Puget Sound on 21 January for a third overhaul that lasted from 25 January to 24 March.

Pennsylvania returned to San Pedro on 27 March and then joined the fleet in San Francisco on 5 April. The ships then steamed to Hawaii for training exercises before departing on 1 July for a major cruise across the Pacific to Australia. They reached Melbourne on 22 July, and on 6 August Pennsylvania steamed to Wellington, New Zealand, where she stayed from 11 to 22 August. On the voyage back to the United States, they stopped in Pago Pago in American Samoa and Hawaii, before reaching San Pedro on 26 September. Pennsylvania went to San Diego for target practice from 5 to 8 October, thereafter returning to San Pedro, where she remained largely idle for the rest of 1925. She left San Pedro with the Battle Fleet on 1 February 1926 for another visit to Balboa, during which the ships conducted tactical training from 15 to 27 February. Pennsylvania spent early March in California before departing for Puget Sound on 15 March for another refit that lasted until 14 May, at which point she returned to San Pedro. Another tour of west coast ports began on 16 June and ended on 1 September back in San Pedro.

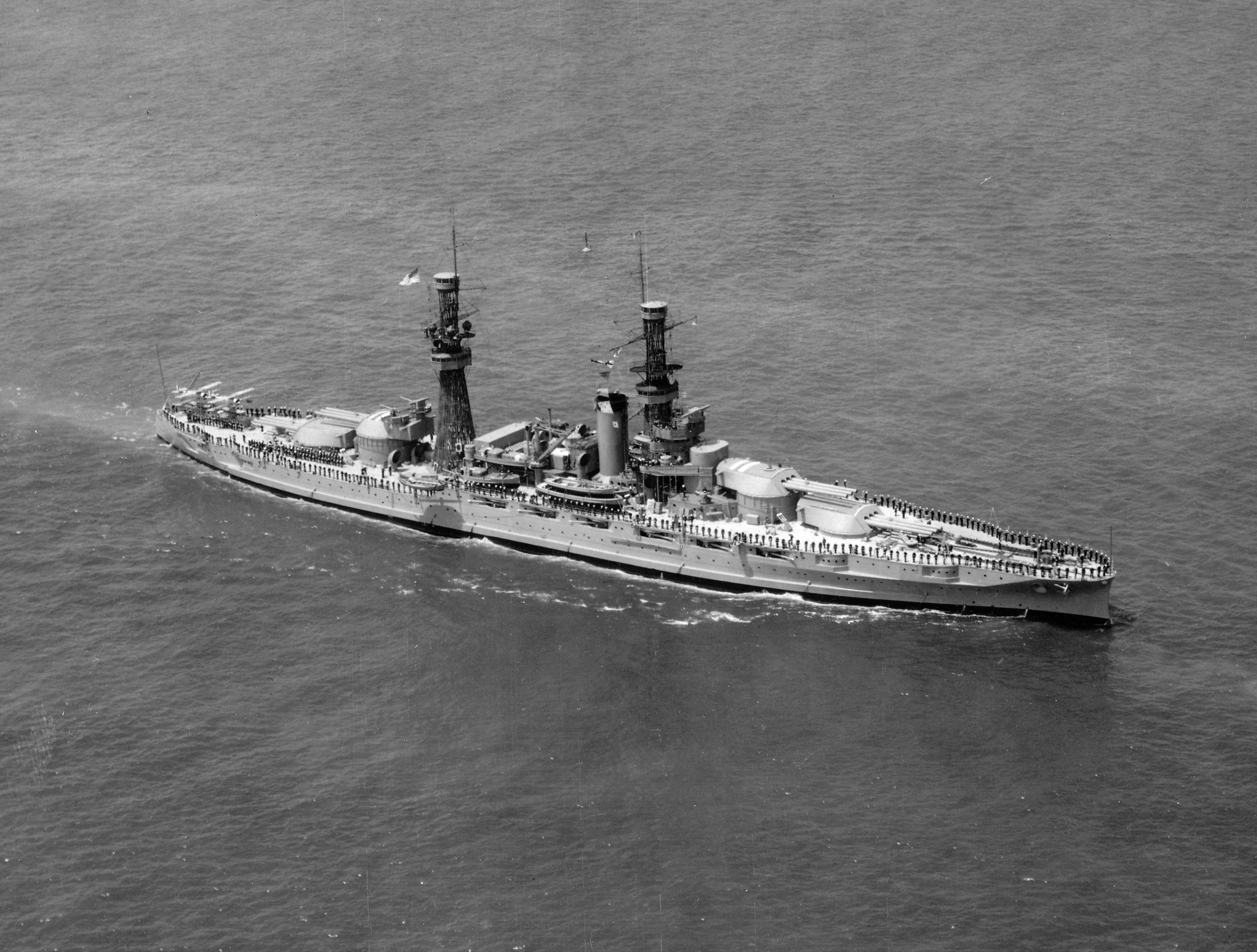
Pennsylvania during a fleet review on 4 June 1927

Pennsylvania remained at San Pedro from 11 December to 11 January 1927 when she left for another refit at Puget Sound that lasted until 12 March. She returned to San Francisco on 15 March and then moved to San Pedro the next day. She left to join training exercises off Cuba on 17 March; she passed through the canal between 29 and 31 March and arrived in Guantánamo Bay on 4 April. On 18 April, she left Cuba to visit Gonaïves, Haiti before steaming to New York, arriving there on 29 April. After touring the east coast in May, she departed for the canal, which she crossed on 12 June. She remained in Balboa until 12 June, at which point she left for San Pedro, arriving on 28 June. The ship spent the rest of 1927 with training, maintenance, and a tour of the west coast. She went to Puget Sound for a refit on 1 April 1928 that lasted until 16 May, after which she went to San Francisco. She left that same day, however, and steamed back north to visit Victoria, British Columbia. She remained there from 24 to 28 May and then returned to San Francisco. She spent June visiting various ports, and in August she embarked Dwight F. Davis, the Secretary of War, in San Francisco; she carried him to Hawaii, departing on 7 August and arriving on the 13th. Pennsylvania returned to Seattle on 26 August.

Another cruise to Cuba took place in January 1929, after which she went to the Philadelphia Navy Yard on 1 June for a major refit and modernization. She received a number of modifications, including increased deck and turret roof armor, anti-torpedo bulges, new turbo-generators, new turbines, and six new three-drum boilers. Her main battery turrets were modified to allow them to elevate to 30 degrees, significantly increasing the range of her guns, and her secondary battery was revised. The number of 5-inch guns was reduced to twelve, and her 3-inch anti-aircraft guns were replaced with eight 5-inch /25 guns. Her torpedo tubes were removed, as were her lattice masts, which were replaced with sturdier tripod masts. Her bridge was also enlarged to increase the space available for an admiral's staff, since she was used as a flagship. Her living space was increased to 2,037 crew and marines, and she was fitted with two catapults for seaplanes.

Pennsylvania returned to service on 1 March 1931 and she conducted trials in Delaware Bay in March and April. She then steamed south to Cuba on 8 May for a training cruise before returning to Philadelphia on 26 May. Another cruise to Cuba followed on 30 July; the ship arrived there on 5 August and this time she steamed across the Caribbean to the Panama Canal, which she transited on 12 August to return to the Battle Fleet. She reached San Pedro on 27 August, where she remained for the rest of the year. She toured the west coast in January 1932 and before crossing over to Pearl Harbor, where she arrived on 3 February. There, she took part in extensive fleet maneuvers as part of Fleet Problem XIII. She returned to San Pedro on 20 March, remaining there until 18 April, when she began another cruise along the coast of California. She returned to San Pedro on 14 November and remained there until the end of the year.

==== 1932–1941 ====
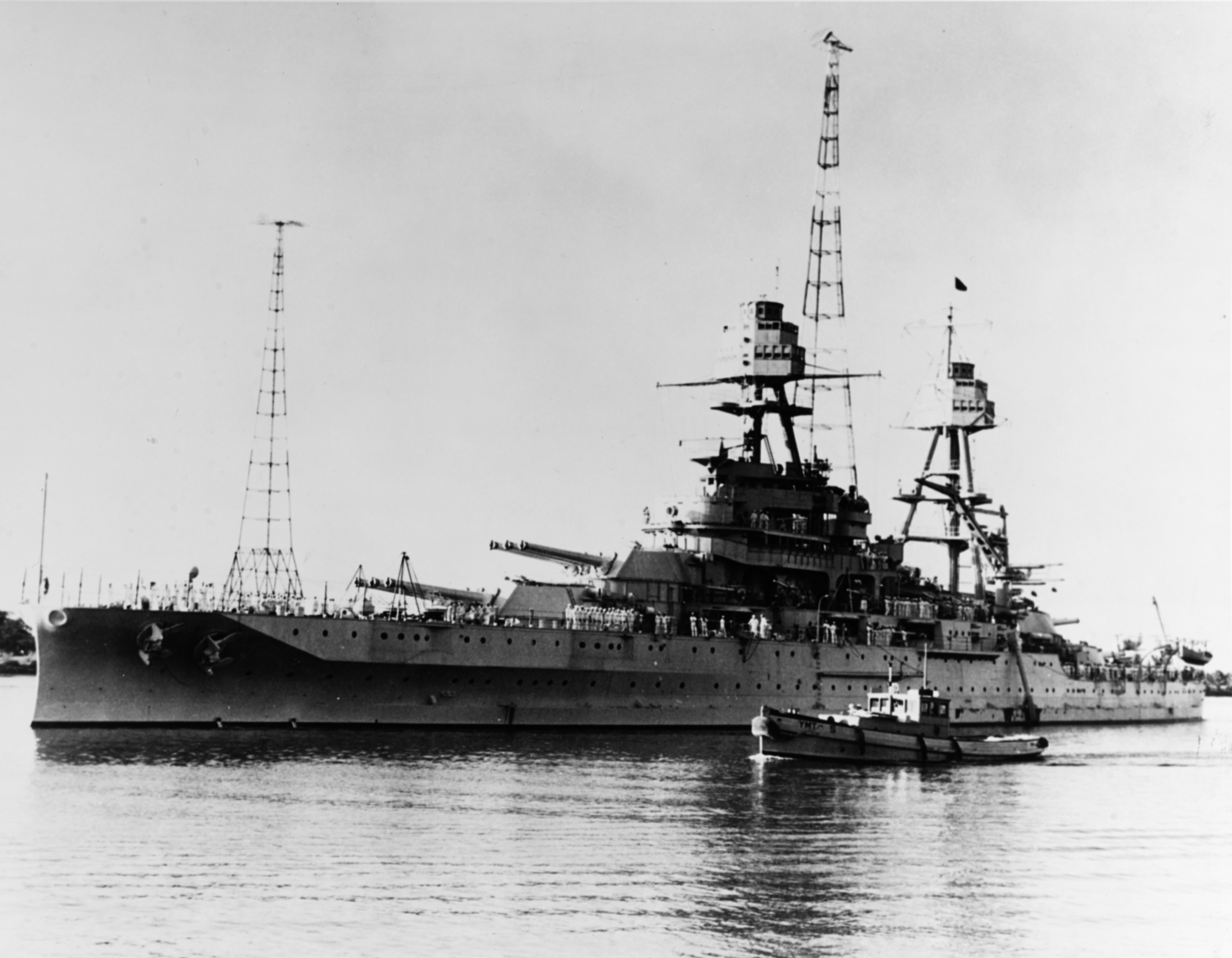
Pennsylvania in Pearl Harbor in 1932, with tripod masts and her enlarged bridge

The ship departed San Pedro on 9 February to participate in Fleet Problem XIV, which lasted from 10 to 17 February. She returned to San Francisco on 17 February and then went to San Pedro on 27 February, remaining there until 19 June. Another west coast cruise followed from 19 June to 14 November, and after returning to San Pedro, Pennsylvania stayed there inactive until early March 1934. From 4 to 8 March, she made a short visit to Hunters Point Naval Shipyard in San Francisco and then returned to San Pedro. From there, she went to join the fleet for Fleet Problem XV, which was held in the Caribbean this year; she passed through the canal on 24 April, the maneuvers having already started on the 19th. They lasted until 12 May, at which point Pennsylvania went to Gonaïves with the rest of the fleet, which then continued on to New York, where it arrived on 31 March. There, Pennsylvania led the fleet in a naval review for now-president Franklin D. Roosevelt. On 15 June, Admiral Joseph M. Reeves took command of the fleet aboard Pennsylvania, which was once again the fleet flagship.

On 18 June, Pennsylvania left New York for the Pacific, stopping in Hampton Roads on 20 June on the way. She passed through the canal on 28 June and reached San Pedro on 7 July. She then went to Puget Sound for a refit that lasted from 14 July to 2 October. The ship left the shipyard on 16 October and returned to San Francisco two days later, beginning a period of cruises off the coast of California and visits to cities in the state. She ended the year in San Pedro, remaining there or in San Francisco until 29 April 1935, when she took part in Fleet Problem XVI in the Hawaiian islands. The maneuvers lasted until 10 June, and were the largest set of exercises conducted by the US Navy at the time. The ship then returned to San Pedro on 17 June and embarked on a cruise of the west coast for several months; on 16 December, she went to Puget Sound for another overhaul that lasted from 20 December to 21 March 1936. Fleet Problem XVII followed from 27 April to 7 June, this time being held off Balboa. She returned to San Pedro on 6 June and spent the rest of the year with training exercises off the west coast and Hawaii, ending the training program for the year in San Pedro on 18 November.

The ship remained in port until 17 February, when she departed for San Clemente, California at the start of a tour along the west coast. She participated in Fleet Problem XVIII, which lasted from 16 April to 28 May. Another stint in Puget Sound began on 6 June and concluded on 3 September, when she returned to San Pedro. She spent the rest of the year alternating between there and San Francisco, seeing little activity. She made a short trip to San Francisco in February 1938 and took part in Fleet Problem XIX from 9 March to 30 April. Another period in San Pedro followed until 20 June, after which she embarked on a two-month cruise along the west coast that concluded with another stay at Puget Sound on 28 September. After concluding her repairs on 16 December, she returned to San Pedro by way of San Francisco, arriving on 22 December. Fleet Problem XX occurred earlier the year than it had in previous iterations, taking place from 20 to 27 February 1939 in Cuban waters. During the exercises, Franklin Roosevelt and Admiral William D. Leahy, the CNO, came aboard Pennsylvania to observe the maneuvers.

The ship then went to Culebra on 27 February, departing on 4 March to visit Port-au-Prince, Haiti from 6 to 11 March. A stay in Guantanamo Bay followed from 12 to 31 March, after which she went to visit the US Naval Academy in Annapolis on 5 April. Pennsylvania began the voyage back to the Pacific on 18 April and passed through the canal at the end of the month, ultimately arriving back in San Pedro on 12 May. Another tour of the west coast followed, which included stops in San Francisco, Tacoma, and Seattle, and ended in San Pedro on 20 October. She went to Hawaii to participate in Fleet Problem XXI on 2 April 1940. The exercises lasted until 17 May, after which the ship remained in Hawaii until 1 September, when she left for San Pedro. The battleship then went to Puget Sound on 12 September that lasted until 27 December; during the overhaul, she received another four 5-inch /25 guns. She returned to San Pedro on 31 December. Fleet Problem XXII was scheduled for January 1941, but the widening of World War II by this time led the naval command to cancel the exercises. On 7 January, Pennsylvania steamed to Hawaii as part of what was again the Pacific Fleet, based at Pearl Harbor. Over the course of the year, she operated out of Pearl Harbor and made a short voyage to the west coast of the United States from 12 September to 11 October.

=== World War II ===
==== Attack on Pearl Harbor ====
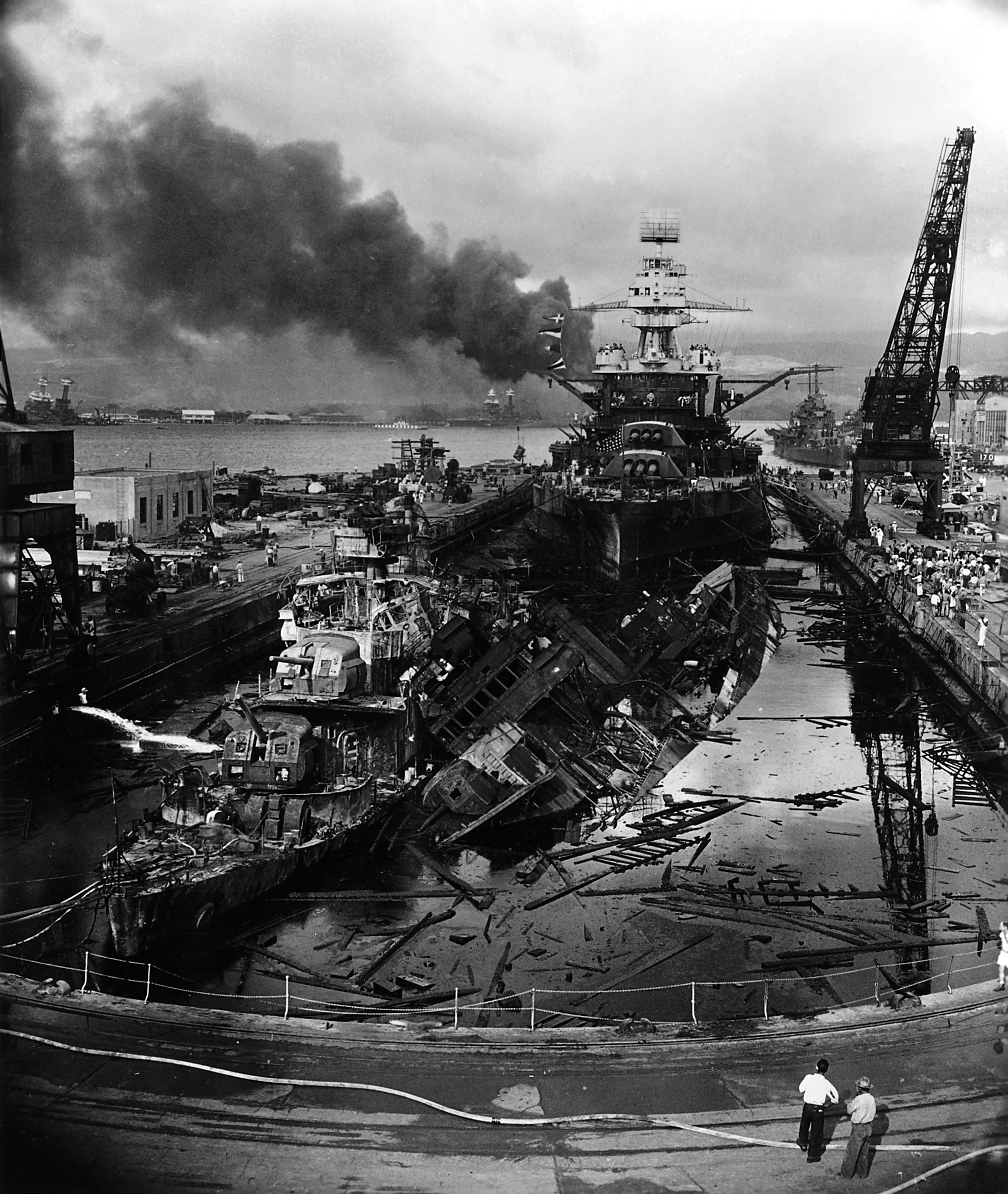
Cassin, Downes and Pennsylvania in the aftermath of the attack on Pearl Harbor

On the morning of 7 December, Pennsylvania was in Dry Dock No. 1 in Pearl Harbor undergoing a refit; three of her four screws were removed. The destroyers Cassin and Downes were also in the dock with her. When it became clear that the port was under air attack from the Japanese fleet, Pennsylvania's crew rushed to their battle stations, and between 08:02 and 08:05, her anti-aircraft gunners began engaging the hostile aircraft. Japanese torpedo bombers unsuccessfully attempted to torpedo the side of the drydock to flood it; having failed, several aircraft then strafed Pennsylvania. At 08:30, several high-altitude bombers began a series of attacks on the ship; over the course of the following fifteen minutes, five aircraft attempted to hit her from different directions. One of the Japanese bombers hit Downes and one scored a hit on Pennsylvania that passed through the boat deck and exploded in casemate No. 9. Pennsylvania's anti-aircraft gunners fired at all of these aircraft but failed to hit any of them, apparently owing to incorrect fuse settings that caused the shells to explode before they reached the correct altitude. The gunners did manage to shoot down a low-flying aircraft that attempted to strafe the ship; they claimed to have shot down another five aircraft, but the after-action investigation noted that only two aircraft were likely hit by Pennsylvania's guns.

By 09:20, both destroyers were on fire from bomb hits and the fire had spread to Pennsylvania, so the drydock was flooded to help contain the fire. Ten minutes later, the destroyers began to explode as the fires spread to ammunition magazines, and at 09:41, Downes was shattered by an explosion that scattered parts of the ship around the area. One of her torpedo tubes, weighing 500 to 1,000 pounds (230 to 450 kg), was launched into the air, striking Pennsylvania's forecastle. As part of her crew battled the fire in her bow, other men used the ship's boats to ferry anti-aircraft ammunition from stores in the West Loch of Pearl Harbor. Beginning at 14:00, the crew began preparatory work to repair the bomb damage; a 5-inch /25 gun and a 5-inch /51 casemate gun were taken from the damaged battleship West Virginia to replace weapons damaged aboard Pennsylvania. In the course of the attack, Pennsylvania had 15 men killed (including her executive officer), 14 missing, and 38 wounded. On 12 December, Pennsylvania was refloated and taken out of the drydock; having been only lightly damaged in the attack, she was ready to go to sea. She departed Pearl Harbor on 20 December and arrived in San Francisco nine days later. She went into drydock at Hunter's Point on 1 January 1942 for repairs that were completed on 12 January.

The ship left San Francisco on 20 February and began gunnery training before returning to San Francisco the next day. Further training followed in March, and from 14 April to 1 August, she took part in extensive maneuvers off the coast of California; during this period, she underwent an overhaul at the Mare Island Naval Shipyard in San Francisco. The work involved considerably strengthening the ship's anti-aircraft capabilities, with ten Bofors 40 mm quad mounts and fifty-one Oerlikon 20 mm single mounts. The tripod mainmast was removed, with the stump replaced by a deckhouse above which the aft main battery director cupola was housed. One of the new CXAM-1 radars was installed above the cupola. The older 5-inch /51 cal anti-ship guns in casemates and 5-inch /25 cal anti-aircraft guns were replaced with rapid fire 5-inch /38 cal guns in eight twin turret mounts. The new 5"/38 cal dual purpose guns could elevate to 85 degrees and fire at a rate of one round every four seconds. The ship briefly went to sea during the Battle of Midway as part of Task Force 1, commanded by Vice Admiral William S. Pye, but the ships did not see action during the operation.

==== Aleutians and Makin Atoll ====
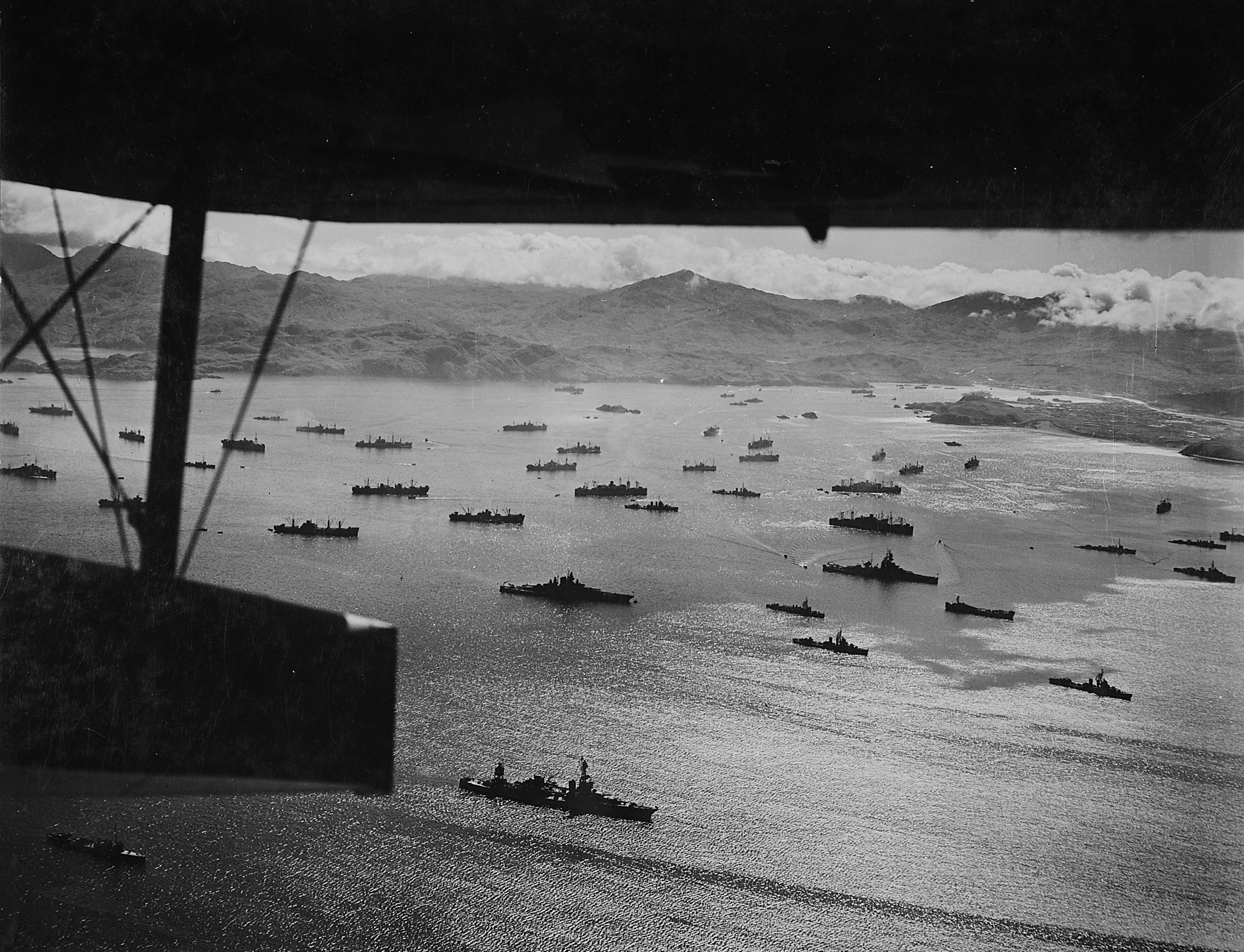
The invasion fleet for Kiska in August 1943

On 1 August, Pennsylvania left San Francisco, bound for Pearl Harbor. She arrived there on 14 August and took part in further training, including guard tactics for aircraft carrier task forces. Another overhaul followed in San Francisco from 3 to 10 January 1943. After further training and tests at San Francisco and Long Beach that lasted into April, she departed to join the Aleutian Islands Campaign on 23 April. She bombarded Holtz Bay and Chichagof Harbor on 11–12 May to support the forces that went ashore on the island of Attu. While she was leaving the area on the 12th, the Japanese submarine I-31 launched a torpedo at the ship, which was observed by a patrolling PBY Catalina flying boat. The Catalina radioed Pennsylvania, which took evasive maneuvers and escaped unharmed; a pair of destroyers then spent the next ten hours hunting the submarine before severely damaging her and forcing her to surface. I-31 was later sunk by another destroyer the next day.

Pennsylvania returned to Holtz Bay on 14 May to conduct another bombardment in support of an infantry attack on the western side of the bay. She continued operations in the area until 19 May, when she steamed to Adak Island for another amphibious assault. While en route, one of her gasoline stowage compartments exploded, which caused structural damage, though no one was injured in the accident. She was forced to leave Adak on 21 May for repairs at Puget Sound that lasted from 31 May to 15 June; during the overhaul, another accidental explosion killed one man and injured a second. She left port on 1 August, bound for Adak, which she reached on 7 August. There, she became the flagship of Admiral Francis W. Rockwell, commander of the task force that was to attack Kiska. The troops went ashore on 15 August but met no resistance, the Japanese having evacuated without US forces in the area having becoming aware of it. Pennsylvania patrolled off Kiska for several days before returning to Adak on 23 August.

Two days later, the battleship departed Adak for Pearl Harbor, arriving there on 1 September. She embarked a contingent of 790 passengers before steaming on 19 September, bound for San Francisco. She arrived there six days later and debarked her passengers before returning to Pearl Harbor on 6 October to take part in bombardment training from 20 to 23 October and 31 October – 4 November. Now the flagship of Rear Admiral Richmond K. Turner, the commander of the Fifth Amphibious Force, itself part of the Northern Attack Force, Pennsylvania left Pearl Harbor on 10 November to lead the assault on Makin Atoll, part of the Gilbert Islands. She was joined by three other battleships, four cruisers, three escort carriers, and numerous transports and destroyers; they arrived off Makin on 20 November, and Pennsylvania opened fire on Butaritari Island that morning at a range of 14,200 yards (13,000 m), beginning the Battle of Makin. Early on the morning of 24 November, the ship was rocked by an explosion off her starboard bow; lookouts reported that the escort carrier Liscome Bay had been torpedoed and had exploded. Japanese torpedo bombers conducted repeated nighttime attacks on 25 and 26 November, but they failed to score any hits on the American fleet. Pennsylvania left the area on 30 November to return to Pearl Harbor.

==== Marshalls and Marianas campaigns ====
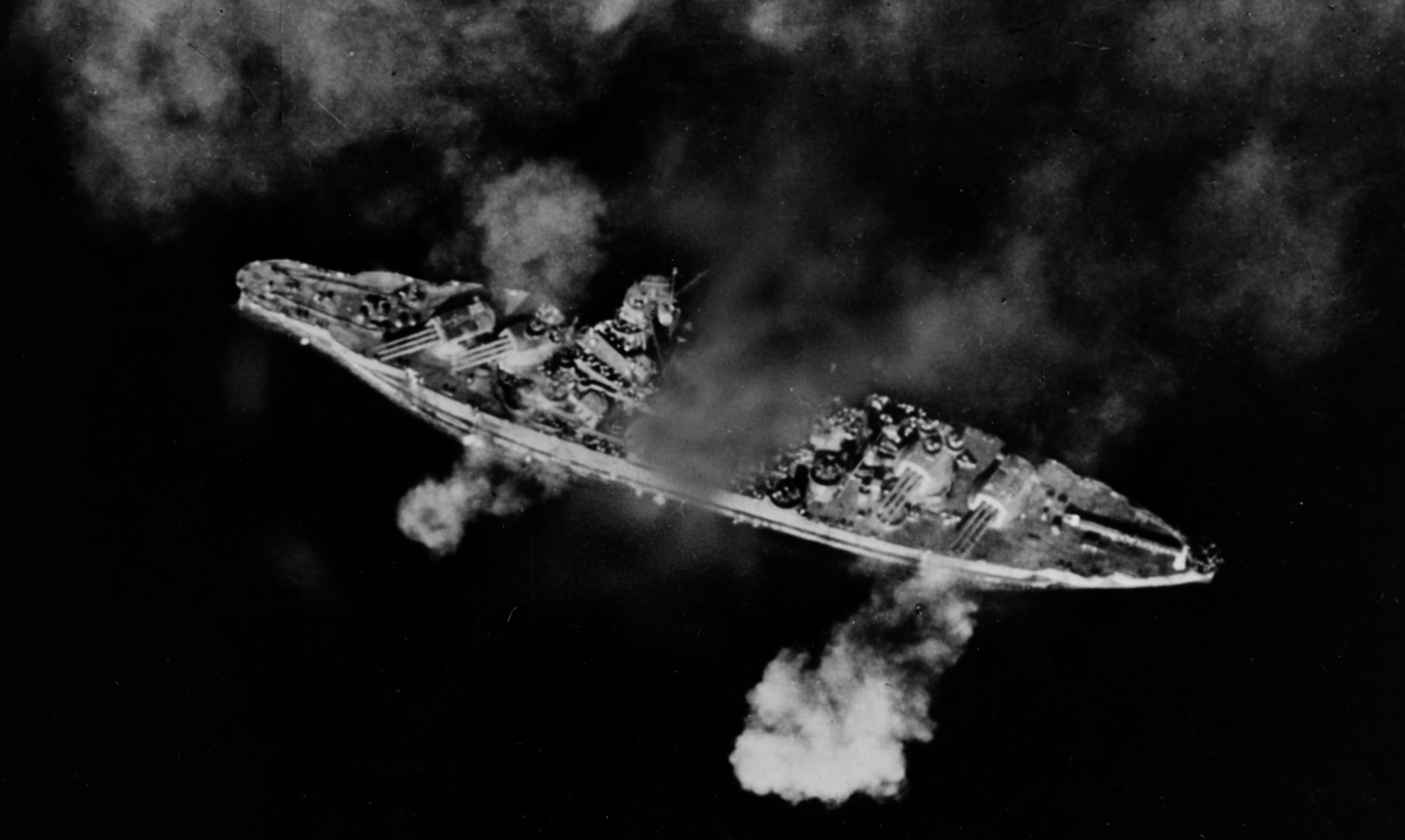
Pennsylvania shelling Guam on 21 July

At the start of 1944, Pennsylvania was at Pearl Harbor; over the course of the first two weeks of January, she took part in maneuvers in preparation for landings on Kwajalein in the Marshall Islands. She departed Pearl Harbor on 22 January in company with the invasion fleet, and on 31 January she began her preparatory bombardment of the atoll to start the Battle of Kwajalein. Troops went ashore the next day, and Pennsylvania remained offshore to provide artillery support to the marines as they fought to secure the island. By the evening of 3 February, the Japanese defenders had been defeated, allowing the ship to depart to Majuro Atoll to replenish her ammunition supply. She left shortly thereafter, on 12 February, to support the next major attack on Eniwetok in the Marshalls; five days later she arrived off the island, the Battle of Eniwetok already underway, and over the course of 20 and 21 February, she shelled the island heavily to support the men fighting ashore. On 22 February, she supported the landing on Parry Island, part of the Eniwetok atoll.

On 1 March, Pennsylvania steamed back to Majuro before proceeding south to Havannah Harbor on Efate Island in the New Hebrides. She remained there until 24 April, when she left for a short visit to Sydney, Australia from 29 April to 11 May, when she returned to Efate. She thereafter steamed to Port Purvis on Florida Island, in the Solomons, to participate in amphibious assault exercises. After replenishing ammunition and supplies at Efate, she left on 2 June, bound for Roi, arriving there six days later. On 10 June, she joined a force of battleships, cruisers, escort carriers, and destroyers that had assembled for the Marianas campaign. While en route that night, one of the escorting destroyers reported a sonar contact and the ships of the fleet took evasive maneuvers; in the darkness, Pennsylvania accidentally collided with the troop transport Talbot. Pennsylvania incurred only minor damage and was able to continue with the fleet, but Talbot had to return to Eniwetok for emergency repairs.

Pennsylvania began her bombardment of Saipan on 14 June to prepare the island for the assault that came the next day. She continued shelling the island while cruising off Tinian on 15 June as the assault craft went ashore. On 16 June, she attacked Japanese positions at Orote Point on Guam before returning to Saipan. She left the area on 25 June to replenish at Eniwetok, returning to join the preparatory bombardment of Guam on 12 July. The shelling continued for two days, and late on 14 July, she steamed to Saipan to again replenish her ammunition. Back on station three days later, she continued to blast the island through 20 July. This work also included suppressing guns that fired on demolition parties that went ashore to destroy landing obstacles. On the morning of 21 July, Pennsylvania took up her bombardment position off Orote Point as the assault craft prepared to launch their attack. The ship operated off the island supporting the men fighting there for the next two weeks.

==== Operations in the Philippines ====
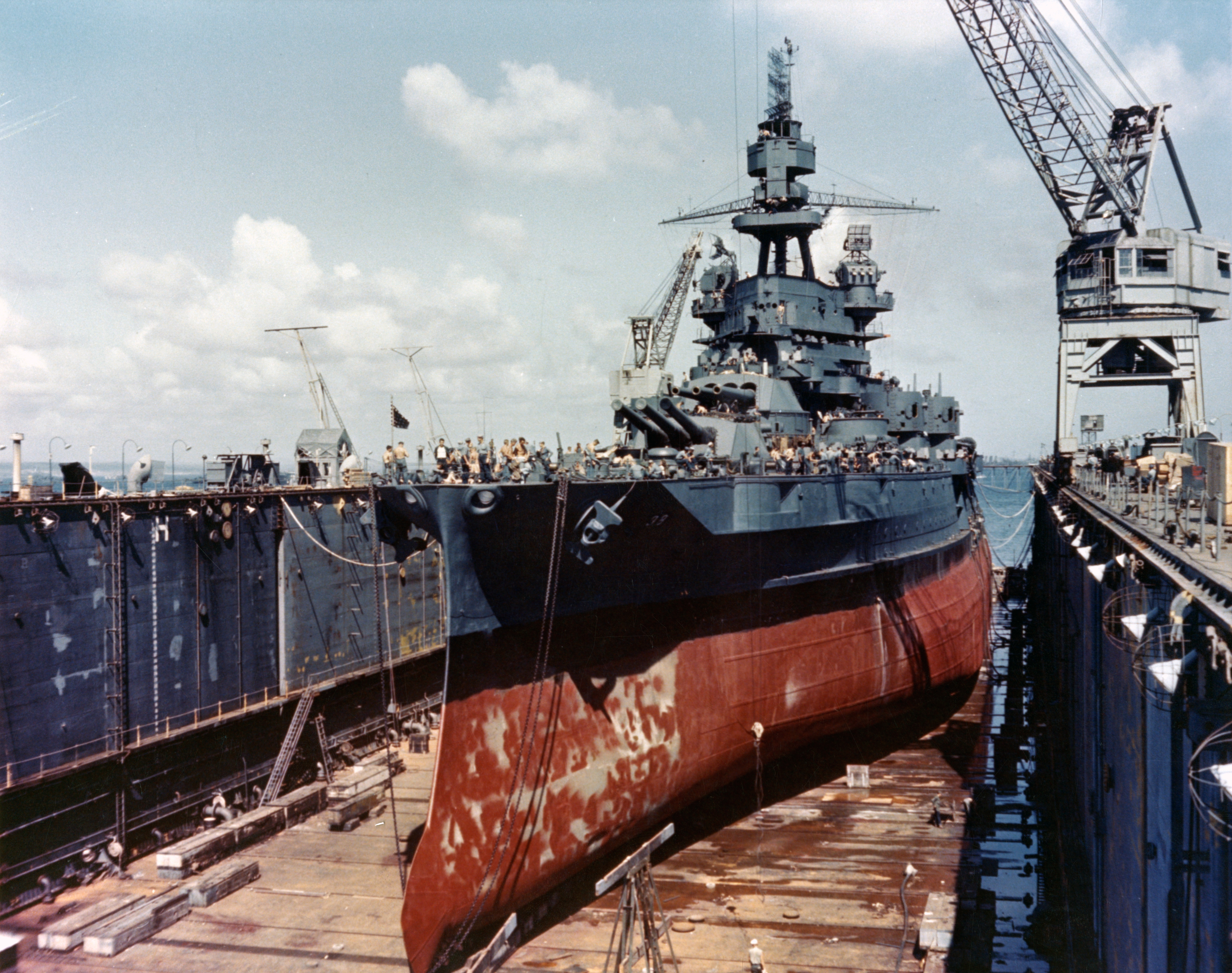
Pennsylvania drydocked in the Pacific, c. 1944

Pennsylvania left Guam on 3 August to replenish at Eniwetok, arriving there on 19 August. From there, she steamed to Espiritu Santo in the New Hebrides before joining landing training off Guadalcanal. The ship left on 6 September as part of the Bombardment and Fire Support Group for the invasion of Peleliu. She bombarded the island from 12 to 14 September and supported the landings the next day. She shelled Angaur on 17 September and remained there for three days, departing on 20 September. She then steamed to Seeadler Harbor on Manus, one of the Admiralty Islands for repairs. On 28 September, she arrived there and entered a floating dry dock on 1 October for a week's repairs. Pennsylvania left on 12 October in company with the battleships Mississippi, Tennessee, California, Maryland, and West Virginia, under the command of Rear Admiral Jesse B. Oldendorf. These ships, designated Task Group 77.2, formed the Fire Support Group for the upcoming operations in the Philippines. They arrived off Leyte on 18 October and took up bombardment positions; over the next four days, they covered Underwater Demolition Teams, beach reconnaissance operations, and minesweepers clearing the way for the landing force.

On 24 October, reports of Japanese naval forces approaching the area led Oldendorf's ships to prepare for action at the exit of the Surigao Strait. Vice Admiral Shōji Nishimura's Southern Force steamed through the Surigao Strait to attack the invasion fleet in Leyte Gulf; his force comprised Battleship Division 2—the battleships Yamashiro and Fusō, the heavy cruiser Mogami, and four destroyers—and Vice Admiral Kiyohide Shima's Second Striking Force—the heavy cruisers Nachi and Ashigara, the light cruiser Abukuma, and four more destroyers. As Nishimura's flotilla passed through the strait on the night of 24 October, they came under attack from American PT boats, followed by destroyers, initiating the Battle of Surigao Strait. One of these destroyers torpedoed Fusō and disabled her, though Nishimura continued on toward his objective.

In the early hours of 25 October, the Southern Force came into contact with Oldendorf's battleships, which had positioned themselves to cross Nishimura's T. At 03:53, West Virginia opened fire, followed by some of the other battleships, though Pennsylvania had trouble locating a target in the darkness with her search radar. Her older Mark 3 radar was not as effective as the more modern sets on West Virginia and some of the other battleships. Task Group 77.2's battleships effectively annihilated Battleship Division 2; Shima's Second Striking Force had fallen behind and had not yet entered the fray. Yamashiro was set on fire and then exploded; she turned to flee, covered by a salvo of torpedoes from the burning Mogami, but the American battleships were able to evade them without damage. Despite having disengaged from Oldendorf's battleships, Yamashiro was hit by more torpedoes and capsized and sank around 04:20. Shima's ships passed the still-floating Fusō and realized that Nishimura had entered a trap, so he reversed course to flee; in the confusion, his flagship Nachi collided with Mogami, damaging her and slowing her to be attacked by American light forces. She was later sunk, as were three of the four destroyers. Later on 25 October, Pennsylvania's anti-aircraft gunners helped to shoot down four aircraft that attacked a nearby destroyer.

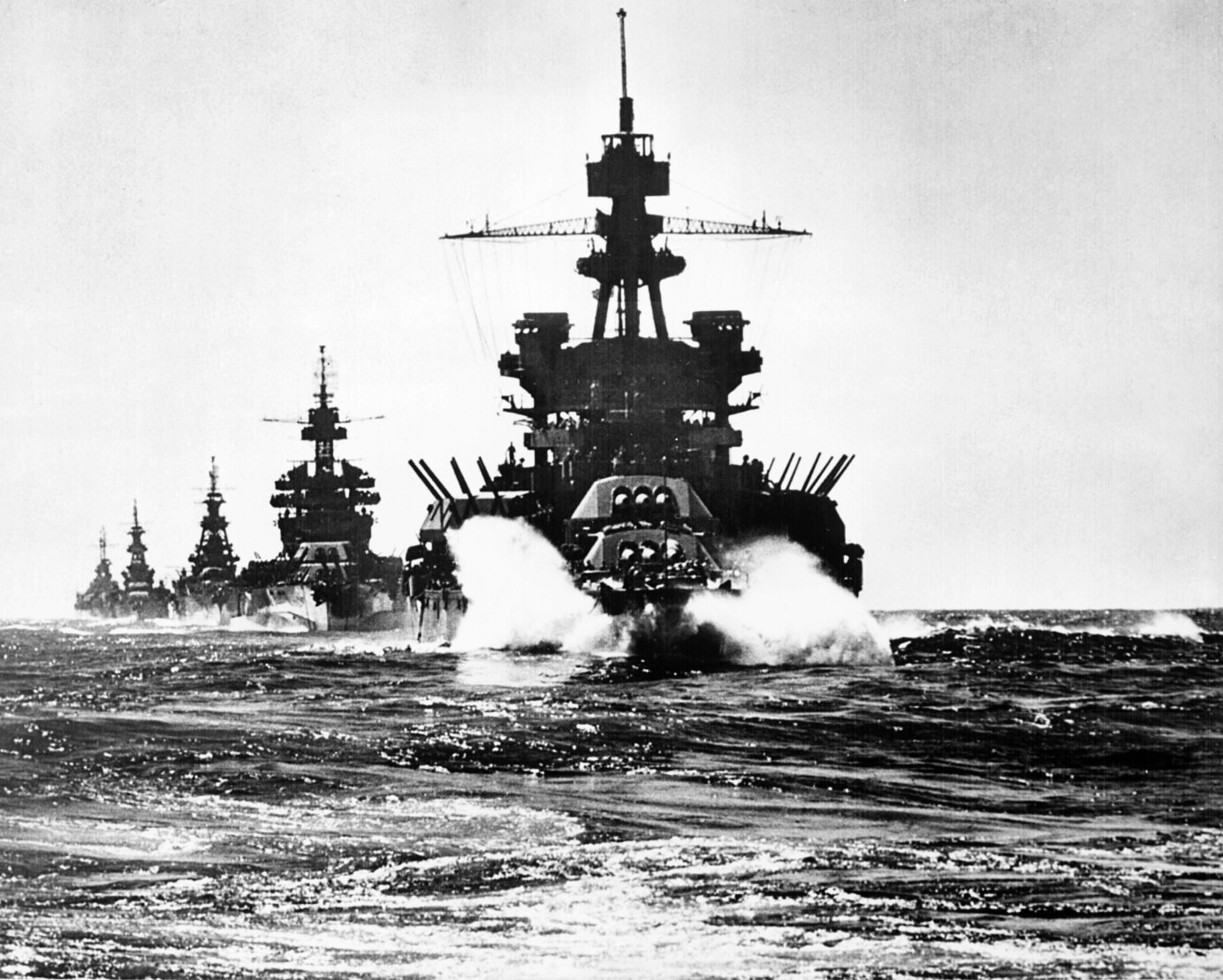
Pennsylvania leading Colorado, Louisville, Portland and Columbia into Lingayen Gulf, Philippines, January 1945

Late on 28 October, Pennsylvania shot down a torpedo bomber. The ship remained on station off Leyte until 25 November, when she departed for Manus, from which she steamed to Kossol Roads off Palau on 15 December to refill her magazines. She conducted gunnery training on 22 December, and on 1 January 1945, Pennsylvania re-joined Oldendorf's Fire Support Group on the way to Lingayen Gulf for the next major operation in the Philippines. Over the course of 4–5 January, Japanese aircraft repeatedly attacked the ships, including kamikazes that destroyed the escort carrier Ommaney Bay. Pennsylvania began bombarding Japanese positions on Santiago Island at the entrance to Lingayen Gulf on 6 January before entering the gulf that night to suppress Japanese guns while minesweepers cleared the area. The next morning, the rest of Oldendorf's ships joined her in the gulf to begin the main preparatory bombardment, which continued through the 8th. On 9 January, the amphibious assault began as troops from the Sixth United States Army went ashore.

Japanese aircraft struck the invasion fleet on 10 January, and four bombs landed close to Pennsylvania, though she was undamaged. Later that day, a fire control party directed Pennsylvania to shell a group of Japanese tanks that were massing to launch a counterattack on the beachhead. The ship patrolled outside the gulf from 10 to 17 January, when she returned to the gulf; she saw no further action, however, and she departed on 10 February for maintenance at Manus. From there, she left on 22 February for San Francisco, stopping in the Marshalls and at Pearl Harbor on the way. After arriving on 13 March, she underwent a thorough overhaul, including the replacement of her worn-out main battery and secondary guns. She also received a new Mk.34 main battery director, which was equipped with the latest Mk.8 fire control radar, on her aft superstructure. With the kamikaze threat in mind, her anti-aircraft armament was increased to seventy-one 20 mm guns in twenty-seven single and twenty-two twin mounts. An additional pair of 40 mm Bofors guns in a twin mount was installed on top of turret 2, for a total of forty-two guns. With the work done, she went on sea trials off San Francisco, followed by training at San Diego. She left San Francisco on 12 July and arrived in Pearl Harbor on the 18th, where she engaged in further training from 20 to 23 July. The next day, she departed to join the invasion fleet off Okinawa.

While transiting the Pacific, she stopped to bombard Wake Island on 1 August. In the artillery duel with Japanese coastal guns, one of their shells detonated close enough that fragments disabled one of the ship's fire control directors for her 5-inch guns. One of her Curtiss SC Seahawks was damaged in heavy seas, and the destroyer Ordronaux recovered the pilot. Pennsylvania loaded ammunition at Saipan before continuing on to Okinawa, arriving there on 12 August where she became flagship of Task Force 95. That night, while moored next to Tennessee in Buckner Bay, a Japanese torpedo bomber managed to penetrate the Allied defensive screen undetected; the aircraft launched its torpedo at Pennsylvania and hit her aft, causing serious damage. The torpedo opened a hole approximately 30 ft (9.1 m) in diameter, causing the ship to take on a considerable amount of water and begin to settle by the stern. Damage control teams were able to contain the flooding. Twenty men were killed and another ten were injured in the attack, including Oldendorf, who was aboard at the time and suffered several broken ribs. Pennsylvania was the last major US warship to be damaged in the war. The next day, salvage tugs towed her to shallow water where temporary repairs could be effected. On 15 August, the Japanese surrendered, ending the war.

=== Post-war career ===
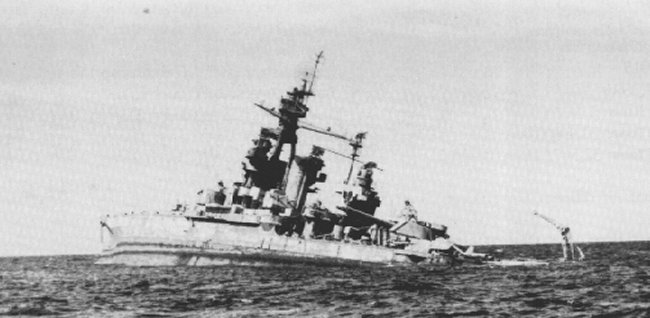
Pennsylvania sinking off Kwajalein Atoll, 10 February 1948

Pennsylvania was taken under tow by a pair of tugboats on 18 August, bound for Apra Harbor, Guam, where they arrived on 6 September. The next day, she was taken into a floating drydock, where a large steel patch was welded over the torpedo hole, which would allow the ship to make the voyage back for permanent repairs. The battleship Missouri relieved Pennsylvania as flagship on 15 September, and on 2 October, she was able to leave the drydock. Two days later, Pennsylvania steamed out of Guam, bound for Puget Sound, where repairs would be effected. She was escorted by the light cruiser Atlanta and the destroyer Walke. While still en route on 17 October, the ship's number 3 propeller shaft slipped aft. Divers were sent to cut the shaft loose; Pennsylvania now had just one operational screw, and the open propeller shaft was now allowing water to leak into the hull. She nevertheless completed the voyage to Puget Sound, arriving on 24 October. The ship received the Navy Unit Commendation for her wartime service there on 3 November.

On 16 January 1946, Pennsylvania was designated to be expended as a target ship for the Operation Crossroads atomic bomb tests at Bikini Atoll to be carried out later that year. Repairs were completed enough to allow her to sail to the Marshall Islands, and she left Puget Sound on 24 February. After stopping in Pearl Harbor, she arrived in Bikini Atoll on 31 May, where she was anchored along with another eighty-three warships. The first explosion, Test Able, took place on 1 July, and was an air burst. After tests determined that the ship had not been contaminated with radiation, the crew returned to the ship from 3 to 24 July. The second blast, Test Baker, was done the next day. This was an underwater detonation, and Pennsylvania was moored just 1,100 yards (1,000 m) from ground zero. She was only lightly damaged from the blast, but the surge of water caused significant radioactive contamination; work parties came aboard the ship from 17 to 21 August to prepare the ship to be towed, and on the 21st she was taken under tow by the transport Niagara, which took her to Kwajalein, where she was decommissioned on 29 August. Various radiological and structural studies were completed over the next year and a half until she was scuttled off Kwajalein on 10 February 1948. She was officially stricken from the Naval Vessel Register on 19 February.

The ship's bell is on display at The Pennsylvania State University near the main entrance of the Wagner Building, home of the university's ROTC programs. It has been on permanent loan to the university from the Department of the Navy since 1955. Two of the ship's 14-inch guns that had been replaced during the 1945 overhaul are on outdoor display at the Pennsylvania Military Museum in Boalsburg, Pennsylvania.
