= Pennsylvania-class battleship =

Dreadnought battleship class of the United States Navy

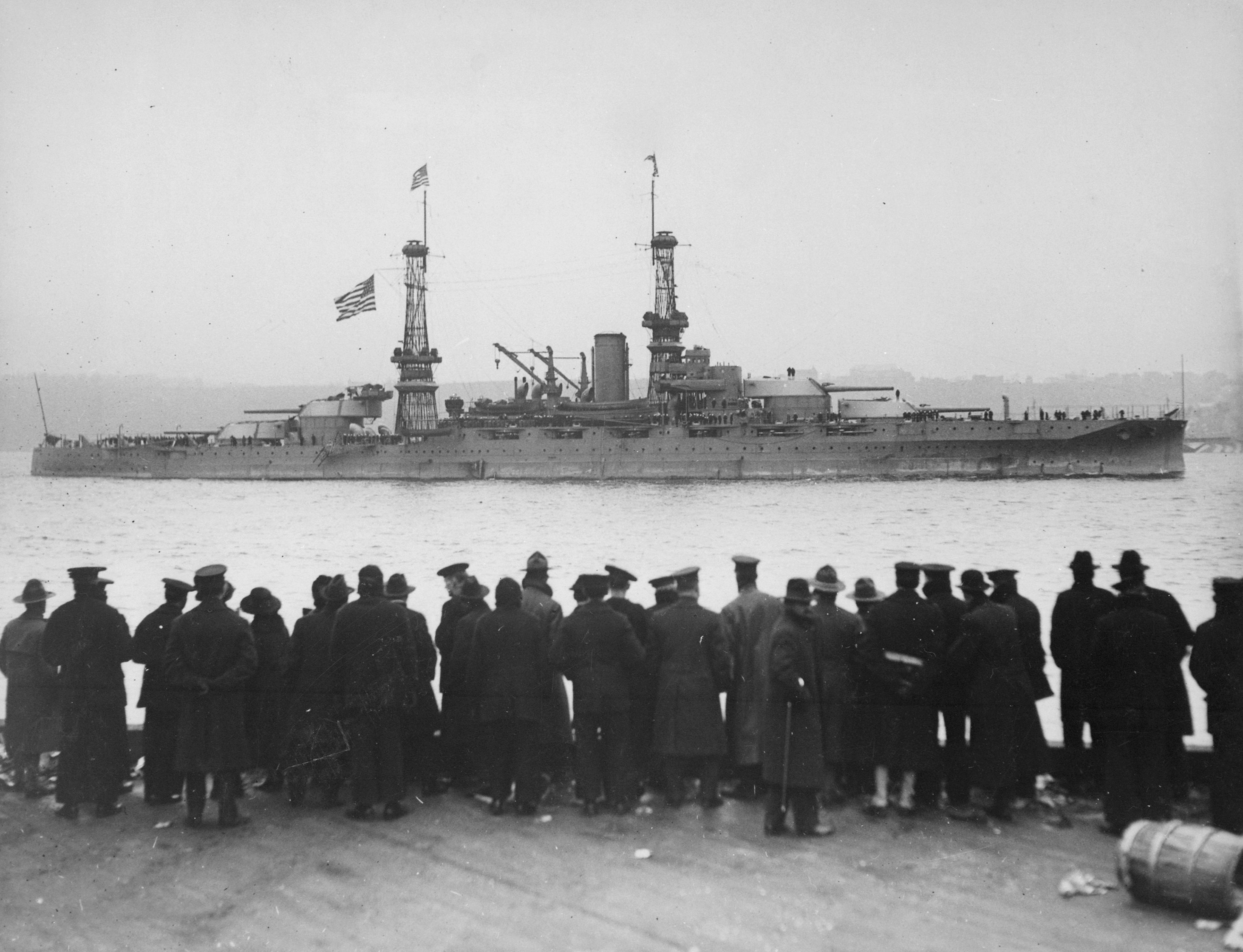
- Arizona at the United States' post-First World War naval review in New York, December 1918

Class overview
- Name: Pennsylvania class
- Builders: Newport News, VA (1); New York Navy Yard, NY (1)
- Operators: United States Navy
- Preceded by: Nevada class
- Succeeded by: New Mexico class
- Cost: $15,000,000 (Note: This figure was also given as $7,800,000 without armor or armament.)
- Built: 1912–1916
- In commission: 1916–1946
- Completed: 2
- Lost: 1
- Retired: 1

General characteristics (as built)
- Type: Dreadnought battleship
- Displacement: 29,158 long tons (29,626 t) (standard); 31,917 long tons (32,429 t) (deep load)
- Length: 600 ft (182.9 m) (waterline); 608 ft (185.3 m) (overall)
- Beam: 97 ft 6 in (29.72 m) (waterline)
- Draft: 29 ft 3 in (8.9 m) (deep load)
- Installed power: 12 × Babcock & Wilcox water-tube boilers; 31,500 shp (23,500 kW)
- Propulsion: 4 × screws; 4 × sets of Curtis (Pennsylvania) or Parsons (Arizona) steam turbines with geared cruising turbines
- Speed: 21.38 knots (39.60 km/h; 24.60 mph) (Pennsylvania's average on trials)
- Range: 6,070 nmi (11,240 km; 6,990 mi) at cruising speed of 12 knots (22 km/h; 14 mph)
- Complement: 55 officers and 860 men
- Armament: 12 × 14 in (356 mm)/45 cal. guns (4×3); 22 × 5 in (127 mm)/51 cal. guns; 4 × 3 in (76 mm)/50 cal. AA guns; 2 × 21 in (533 mm) torpedo tubes
- Armor: Belt: 8–13.5 in (203–343 mm); Bulkheads: 13–8 in (330–203 mm); Barbettes: 13-8 in; Gun turrets: 18–5 in (457–127 mm); Conning tower: 16 in (406 mm); Decks: 1.5–3 in (38–76 mm)

The Pennsylvania class consisted of two super-dreadnought battleships built for the United States Navy just before the First World War. Named Pennsylvania and Arizona, after the American states of the same names, the two battleships were the United States' second battleship design to adhere to the "all or nothing" armor scheme. They were the newest American capital ships when the United States entered the First World War.

The Nevada-class battleships represented a marked increase in the United States' dreadnought technology, and the Pennsylvania class was intended to continue this with slight increases in the ships' capabilities, including two additional 14-inch (356 mm)/45 caliber guns and improved underwater protection. The class was the second standard type battleship class to join the US Navy, along with the preceding Nevada and the succeeding New Mexico, Tennessee and Colorado classes.

In service, the Pennsylvania class saw limited use in the First World War, as a shortage of fuel oil in the United Kingdom meant that only the coal-burning ships of Battleship Division Nine were sent. Both were sent across the Atlantic to France after the war for the Paris Peace Conference of 1919, and were then transferred to the Pacific Fleet before being significantly modernized from 1929 to 1931. For the remainder of the inter-war period, the ships were used in exercises and fleet problems. Both Pennsylvania and Arizona were present during the Japanese attack on Pearl Harbor, which brought the United States into the Second World War. Arizona was sunk by a massive magazine explosion and was turned into a memorial after the war, while Pennsylvania, in dry dock at the time, received only minor damage. After a refit from October 1942 to February 1943, Pennsylvania went on to serve as a shore bombardment ship for most of the remainder of the war. Pennsylvania was present at the Battle of Surigao Strait, the last battle ever between battleships, but did not engage. Pennsylvania was severely damaged by a torpedo on 12 August 1945, two days before the cessation of hostilities. With minimal repairs, she was used in Operation Crossroads, part of the nuclear testing at Bikini Atoll, before being expended as a target ship in 1948.

== Background ==
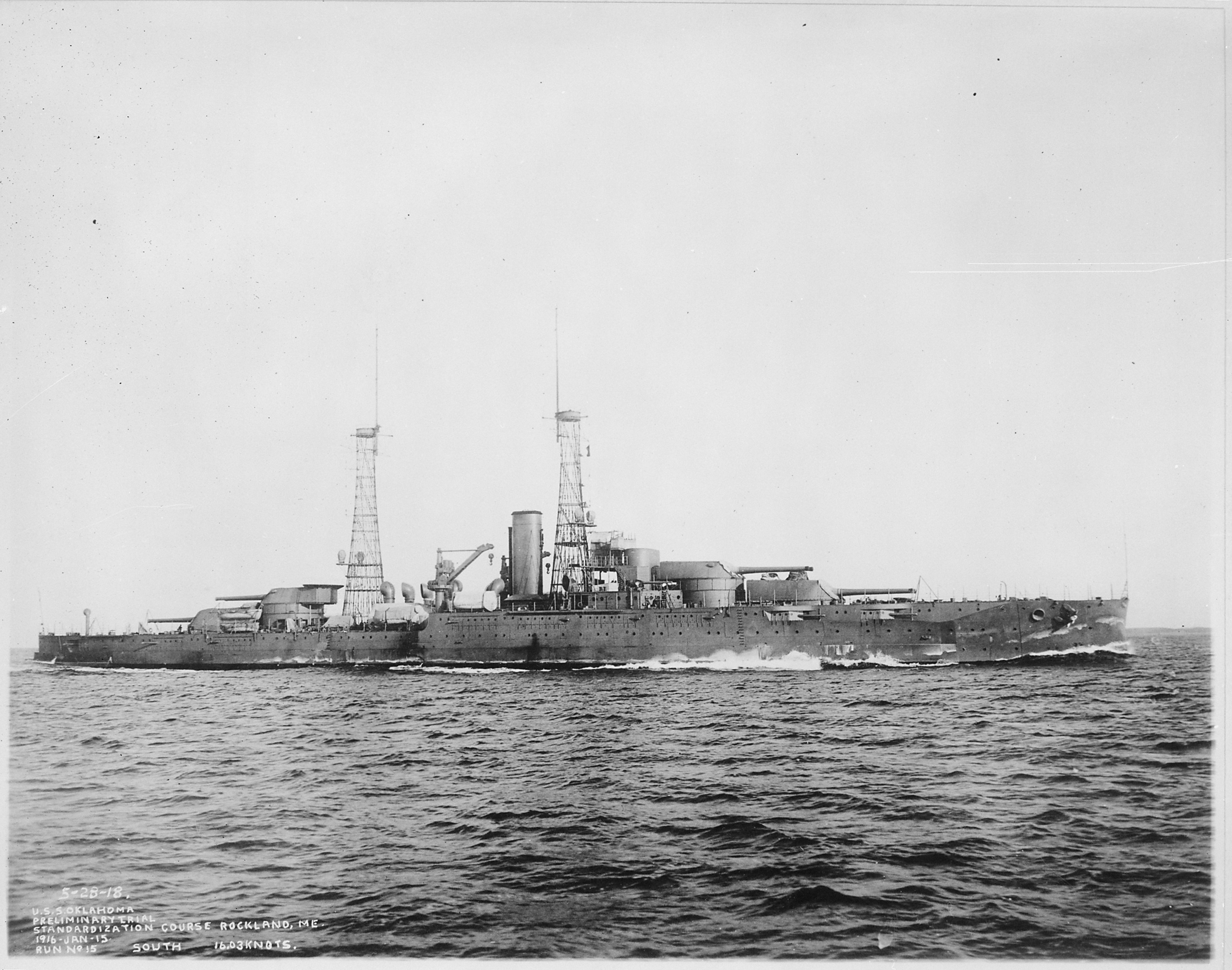
The Nevada class, represented here by Oklahoma in 1916, were the first American battleship class with triple gun turrets, the "all or nothing" armor concept, oil fuel, and steam turbines with geared cruising turbines (albeit the latter only in Nevada); all of these innovations were continued in the Pennsylvania class.

The preceding Nevada-class battleships represented a leap forward from previous American battleship technology and from most contemporary foreign designs. They were the first in the world to employ the "all or nothing" armor scheme that characterized every succeeding American battleship. Devised with the knowledge that engagement ranges between battle fleets was growing greater as main battery sizes increased, the system moved away from previous designs that used heavy, medium, and light armor, in favor of using only heavy armor to protect vital areas on the ship. The new system envisioned that, at long ranges, ships would be attacked with only armor-piercing (AP) projectiles, stoppable only by heavy armor. Medium or light armor would only serve to detonate the shells. By removing gun turrets and reducing the overall protected length of the ship, the navy's designers were able to devote the weight savings to the belt, as well as extra deck armor to protect against plunging shells.

In issuing desired specifications for the design that would become the Nevada class, the Navy's General Board asked for triple gun turrets, i.e., three guns mounted per turret. They were very unsatisfied with the awkward placement required on classes preceding the Nevadas, which had five and six two-gun turrets—yet moving back to the four two-gun turrets of the South Carolina class would be a significant loss in firepower. Although a triple turret was first proposed in American professional magazines in 1901 and briefly considered for the South Carolinas, it was not even in the experimental stage—the first turret was authorized in 1911 and would not be ready until months after contracts for the new ships would be signed with the shipbuilders. The decision to go ahead with the turret was a calculated gamble, but proved to be a qualified success; the only issue came with shell interference when the center and outside guns were fired simultaneously, which was easily solved by delaying the firing of the center barrel by a small fraction of a second. Moreover, there was a major benefit in weight thanks to the accompanying loss of an armored barbette and turret. These weight savings were applied to the armor protection, making the "all or nothing" concept a reality.

The Nevadas were also the first American battleships to use exclusively oil fuel, which had greater thermal efficiency than firing with coal or coal sprayed with oil. The cumulative effect of the change was measured by the navy as a fifty-five percent increase in steam production per pound of fuel (in a design for an oil-fired version of the New York class). This would give oil-fired vessels additional range, an important consideration for ships based in the Pacific, but the Navy's Bureau of Construction and Repair (C&R) pointed out what it saw as the unfortunate side effects, including a lower center of gravity, higher metacentric height, and the loss of coal bunkers, which were employed as part of the armor protection. Within a few years oil tanks below the waterline were considered indispensable parts of the underwater armor scheme employed in American dreadnoughts.

== Design ==
Arizona's starboard propeller shaft

The General Board's call for a new 1913 fiscal year battleship design was sent in June 1911 with the recent Nevada innovations in mind. They desired a ship with a main battery of twelve 14-inch guns in triple turrets, a secondary battery of twenty-two 5-inch (127 mm) guns, a speed of 21 knots (39 km/h; 24 mph), and armor equivalent to that of the Nevadas. The US Navy Bureau of Construction and Repair's (C&R) first sketch was unsatisfactory; their lengthy design of 625 feet (191 m) and 30,000 long tons (30,481 t) actually had less armor than the Nevadas, with a 12.5-inch (320 mm) belt.

The design process was marked by various efforts to meet the General Board's specifications with only a moderate increase in tonnage over the Nevada class. Between January and March 1912, thirteen sketches were prepared for consideration by C&R with reciprocating or turbine engines that traded either speed or metacentric height for armor. Some later designs gave up a half knot of speed to free up about 500 long tons (508 t), enough to thicken the belt from 13.5 to 15 inches (343 to 381 mm) and the barbettes to 14 inches. The choice between double or triple turrets was also still an issue, as the Nevada class had not been completed yet. The Bureau of Ordnance was in favor of waiting for test results, rather than risking reverting to two-gun 14-inch turrets or moving up to two-gun 16-inch turrets.

In March 1912, C&R proposed their seventh, eighth, ninth, and tenth designs to the General Board for approval. The eighth and ninth designs were the ones to give up a half knot of speed, while the tenth was a design with four triple turrets and 1,200 long tons (1,200 t) lighter than the Nevada-class ships. In April, the General Board chose the seventh design, which satisfied all of their requirements, albeit on the largest displacement, 31,300 long tons (31,800 t). The length was fixed at 630 feet (190 m), the beam at 93 feet (28 m), and the draft at 28.5 feet (8.7 m). Steam turbines gave the design 30,500 shaft horsepower (22,700 kW) and 21 knots, while the main armor belt was 13.5 inches tapering to 8 inches (203 mm) at the ends. This design was further refined and emerged in a completed state in September. The delay was partially due to tests on the proposed armor, which were completed in June 1912 and resulted in significant alterations to the Pennsylvania-class' underwater protection.

== Specifications ==
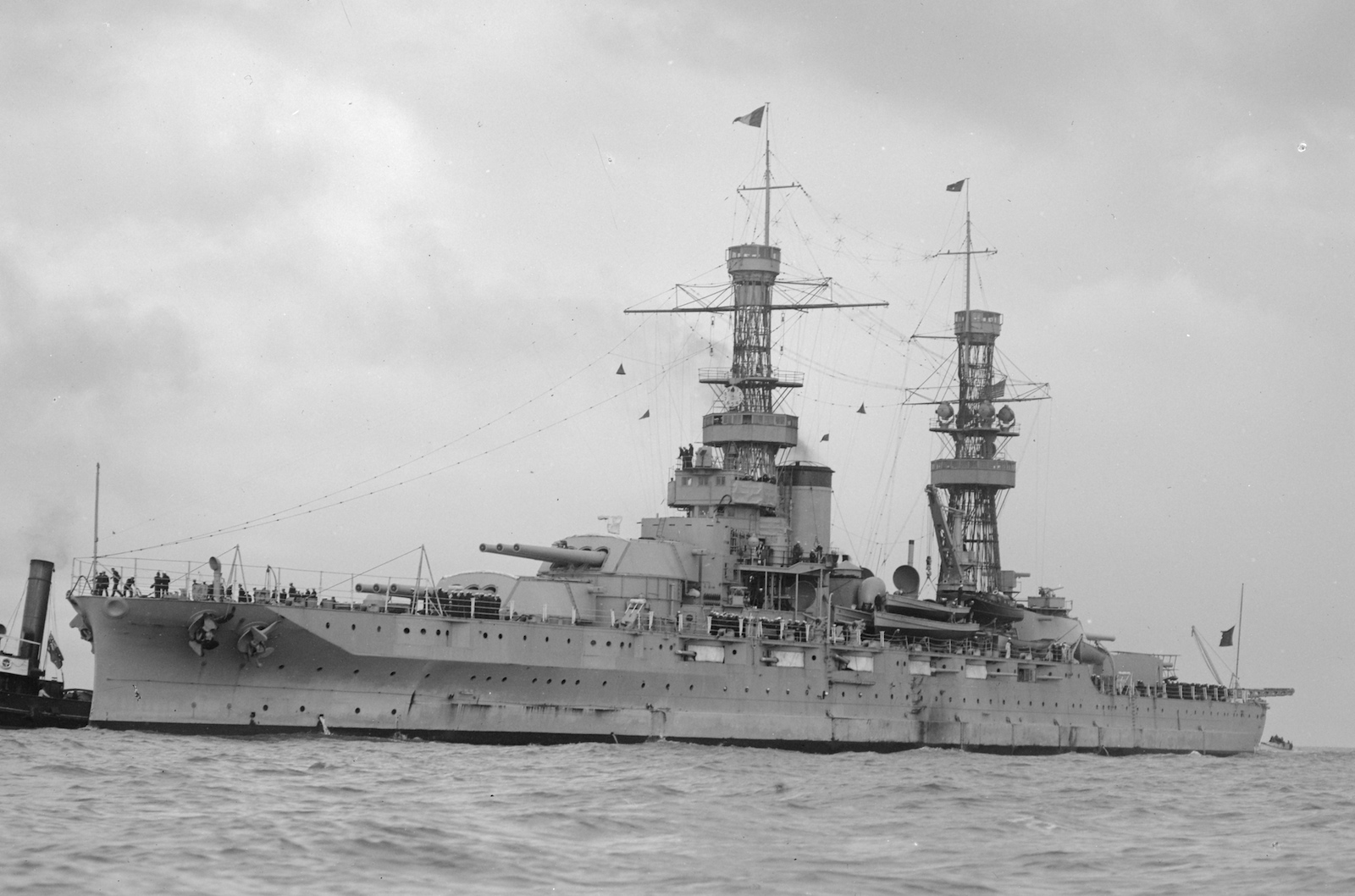
Pennsylvania on a visit to Australia, 1925

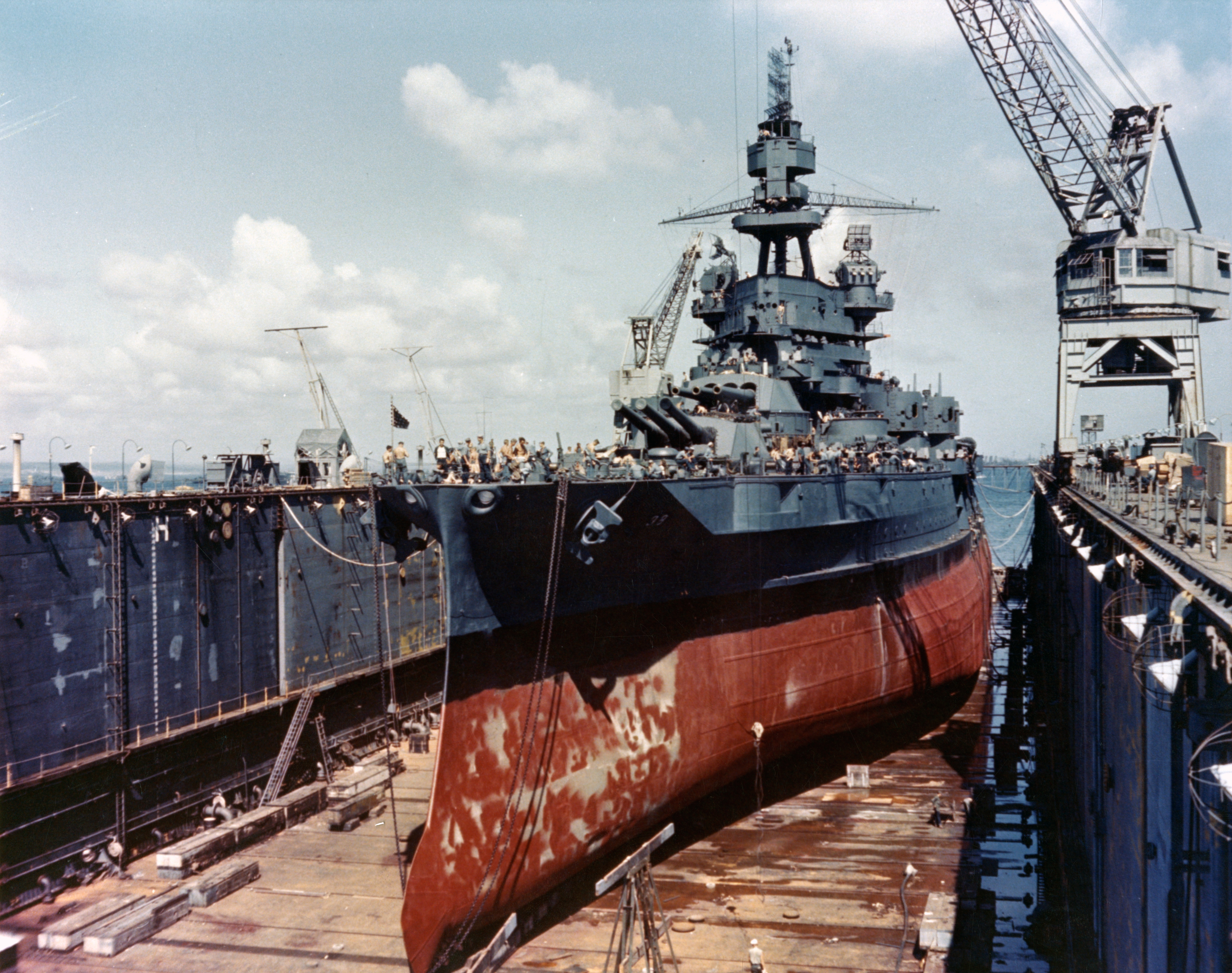
Pennsylvania in dry dock, c. 1944

The Pennsylvania-class ships were significantly larger than their predecessors, the Nevada class. They had a waterline length of 600 feet (182.9 m), an overall length of 608 feet (185.3 m), a beam of 97 feet (29.6 m) (at the waterline), and a draft of 29 feet 3 inches (8.9 m) at deep load. This was 25 feet (7.6 m) longer than the older ships. Its designed standard and full load displacements were 31,400 long tons (31,900 t) and 32,440 long tons (32,960 t), respectively, but they actually displaced 29,158 long tons (29,626 t) standard and 31,917 long tons (32,429 t) at full load, over 4,000 long tons (4,060 t) more than the older ships. The class had a metacentric height of 7.82 feet (2.4 m) at full load.

The ships had four direct drive Parsons steam turbine sets with geared cruising turbines, each of which drove a propeller 12 feet 1.5 inches (3.7 m) in diameter. They were powered by twelve Babcock & Wilcox water-tube boilers. The turbines were designed to produce a total of 31,500 shaft horsepower (23,500 kW), but only achieved 29,366 shp (21,898 kW) during Pennsylvania's sea trials, when it slightly exceeded its designed speed of 21 knots (39 km/h; 24 mph). Pennsylvania reached 21.75 knots (40.28 km/h; 25.03 mph) during full-power trials in 1916, and Arizona reached 21.5 knots (39.8 km/h; 24.7 mph) in September 1924. The class was designed to normally carry 1,548 long tons (1,573 t) of fuel oil, but had a maximum capacity of 2,305 long tons (2,342 t). At full capacity, they could steam at a speed of 12 knots (22 km/h; 14 mph) for an estimated 6,070 nautical miles (11,240 km; 6,990 mi); this could be extended to 7,585 nautical miles (14,050 km; 8,730 mi) with a clean bottom. They had four 300-kilowatt (402 hp) turbo generators.

The Pennsylvania class carried twelve 14-inch/45 caliber guns in triple gun turrets. The guns could not elevate independently and were limited to a maximum elevation of +15° which gave them a maximum range of 21,140 yards (19,330 m). The ships carried 100 shells for each gun. Defense against torpedo boats was provided by twenty-two 5-inch/51 caliber guns mounted in individual casemates in the sides of the hull; these proved vulnerable to sea spray and could not be worked in heavy seas. At an elevation of 15°, they had a maximum range of 14,050 yards (12,850 m). Each gun was provided with 230 rounds of ammunition. The ships mounted four 3-inch (76 mm)/50 caliber anti-aircraft (AA) guns, although only two were fitted when completed. The other pair were added shortly afterward on top of Turret III. The class also mounted two submerged 21-inch (533 mm) torpedo tubes and carried 24 Bliss-Leavitt Mark 3 torpedoes for them.

The Pennsylvania-class design continued the all-or-nothing principle of armoring only the most important areas of the battleships, which began in the preceding Nevada class. The waterline armor belt of Krupp armor measured 13.5 inches thick and only covered the class' machinery spaces and magazines. It had a total height of 17 feet 6 inches (5.3 m), of which 8 feet 9.75 inches (2.7 m) was below the waterline; beginning 2 feet 4 inches (0.7 m) below the waterline, the belt tapered to its minimum thickness of 8 inches. The transverse bulkheads at each end of the ships ranged from 13 to 8 inches in thickness. The faces of the gun turrets were 18 inches (457 mm) thick while the sides were 9–10 inches (230–250 mm) thick and the turret roofs were protected by 5 inches of armor. The armor of the barbettes was 13 to 4.5 inches (330 to 114 mm) thick. The conning tower was protected by 16 inches (406 mm) of armor and had a roof eight inches thick.

The main armor deck was three plates thick with a total thickness of 3 inches; over the steering gear the armor increased to 6.25 inches (159 mm) in two plates. Beneath it was the splinter deck that ranged from 1.5 to 2 inches (38 to 51 mm) in thickness. The boiler uptakes were protected by a conical mantlet that ranged from 9 to 15 inches (230 to 380 mm) in thickness. A 3-inch torpedo bulkhead was placed 9 feet 6 inches (2.9 m) inboard from the side, and the class was provided with a complete double bottom. Testing in mid-1914 revealed that this system could withstand 300 pounds (136 kg) of TNT.

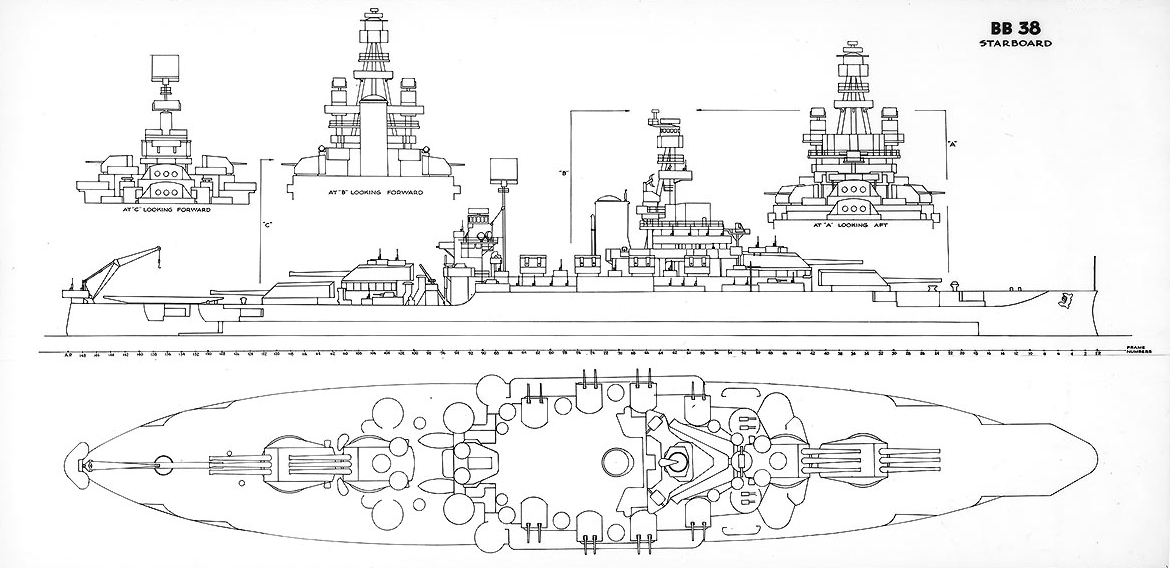
Plans for Pennsylvania drawn during the Second World War, after her late 1920s/early 1930s modernization; it shows the ship from three crossections (top), from the starboard side (middle), and from above (bottom). The most visible change from the ships' original configuration came in the secondary armament, which was moved from casemates into their own twin mounts. This greatly improved range and usage as anti aircraft weapons

== Authorization and construction ==
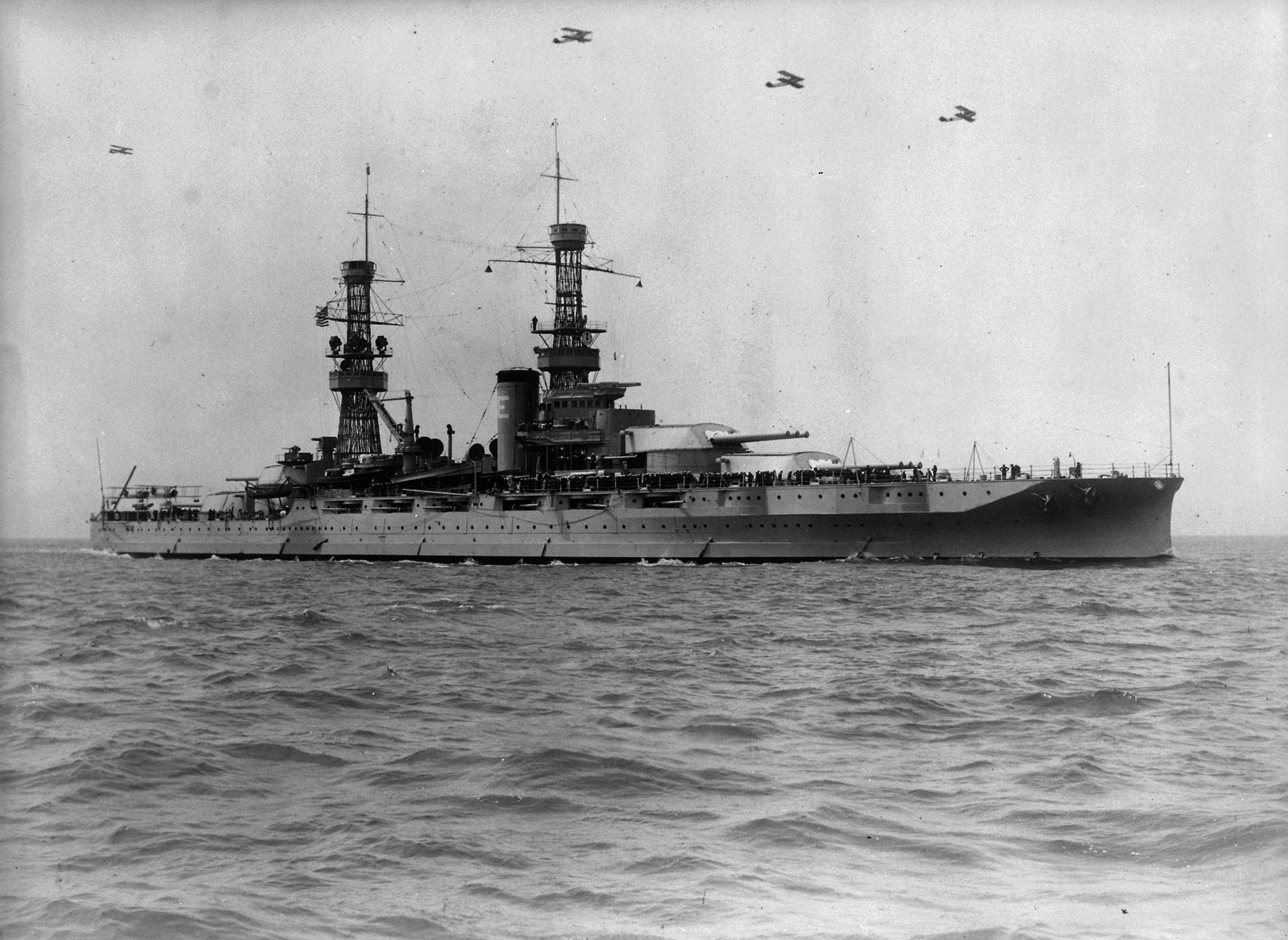
Arizona underway on 4 June 1927, shortly before her modernization

The authorization for the two Pennsylvania-class ships faced political opposition for being too weak and expensive. Senator Benjamin Tillman believed that a much more capable warship was needed because of the shocking increase in battleship size over the previous few years—between 1907 (the Delaware class) and 1912, the displacement of American battleships increased by about fifty percent, from around 20,000 long tons (20,000 t) to 30,000 long tons. Tillman proposed a "maximum battleship" in a Senate resolution in July 1912, which was adopted unanimously:

Resolved: That the Committee on Naval Affairs [is] instructed to investigate and report to the Senate ... the object being to find out from official sources the maximum size and maximum draft, the maximum armament, and the maximum armor to make the best battleship or cruiser the world has ever seen or ever will see; to have this country own the greatest marine engine of war ever constructed or ever to be constructed under known conditions; and to report whether one such overpowering vessel would not in its judgement be better for this country to build than to continue by increasing taxation to spend the millions and millions of dollars now in prospect in the race for naval supremacy. ... Let us leave some money in the Treasury for other more necessary and useful expenditures, such as good roads, controlling the floods in the Mississippi, draining swamp land in the South, and irrigating the arid land in the West. (S 361, 62nd Cong., 2nd sess.)

Tillman's proposal was, in his own words, treated as a "joke"; the Advocate of Peace stated that "it is nearly impossible to read this ... without having an inextinguishable bout of laughter." Still, C&R published multiple studies of a battleship unconstrained by cost, although none of them approached Tillman's ideal. The first design submitted by C&R was a severely enlarged Nevada, or a 38,000 long tons (39,000 t) ship with twelve 14-inch guns, 17 to 9 inches (430 to 230 mm) belt armor, and a maximum speed of 23 knots (43 km/h; 26 mph) for a price of $19.5 million. A later sketch dropped the speed to 20 knots (37 km/h; 23 mph) to see the effect on displacement and cost, which it dropped to 35,000 long tons (36,000 t) and $17 million, respectively, and the consequent shortening of the ship would allow her to enter the dry docks in New York and Norfolk. Tillman was concerned with this speed, and another study increased the speed to 25 knots (46 km/h; 29 mph), trading it for four 14-inch (356 mm) guns, or one-third of the main battery, and much of the armor. (Note: For more information on these studies, see A.D. Zimm, "Build the Limit: The American 'Maximum Battleship' Studies of 1916–17," Warship International 12, no. 1 (1975), 31–59.)

Other politicians in Congress also had concerns with the navy's plans. The House of Representatives refused to fund any new battleships for the fiscal year 1913, though the Senate would fund two in its comparable bill. They eventually compromised on one, and the battleship that would become Pennsylvania was authorized on 22 August 1912. The ship's plans were given to prospective builders on 20 December; bids were opened on 18 February 1913; and the contract was awarded to the lowest bidder, Newport News, on 27 February 1913 at the quoted price of $7,260,000 without armor or armament. The independent bidding process led the navy to claim $750,000 in savings, but the final cost actually came in at $7,800,000 ($15,000,000 with armor and armament).

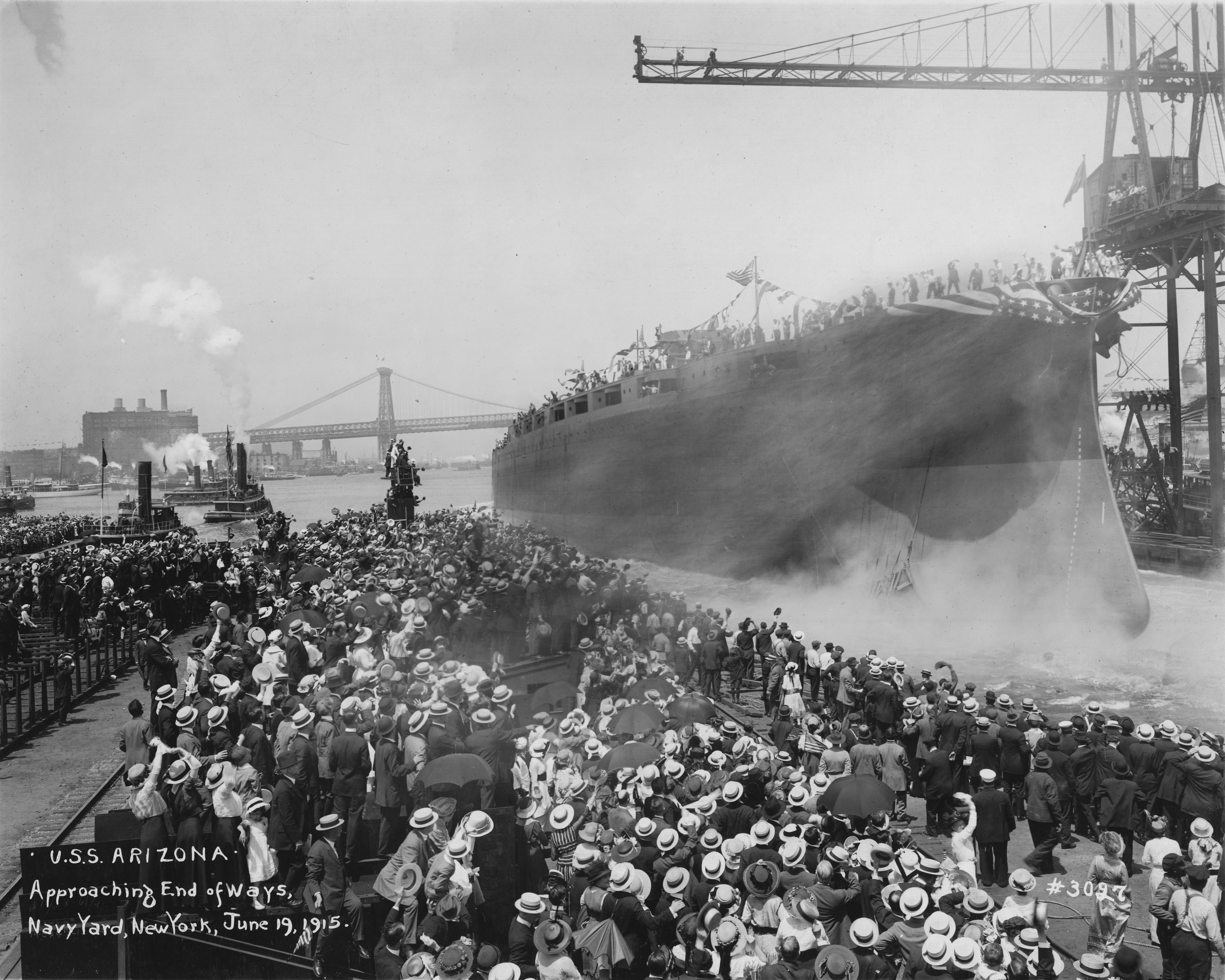
Arizona's launch, 19 June 1915

Arizona was the one approved battleship for the fiscal year 1914. Secretary of the Navy George von Lengerke Meyer had requested three battleships for that fiscal year, citing the former policy of building two per year, plus an additional ship to make up for authorizing only Pennsylvania in the previous year, but congressional compromises once again approved only one new battleship. Arizona was authorized on 4 March 1913, but to avoid a lengthy delay between the two, the ship was ordered much more quickly, on 24 June, by giving the contract to a navy-owned shipyard.

Pennsylvania was laid down on 27 October 1913, with goals of fourteen months until launch, and thirty-two until completion. The as-yet unnamed Arizona was laid down on the morning of 16 March 1914 with Assistant Secretary of the Navy Franklin Delano Roosevelt in attendance, and the builders intended to set a world-record ten months between keel-laying and launch, These ambitious goals—Pennsylvania's anticipated completion date was a full two months earlier than the American record—were set by Navy Secretary Josephus Daniels, who wanted the United States to compete with British and German achievements.

The constructors were not able to meet these goals. Pennsylvania was launched on 16 March 1915, a full seventeen months after keel-laying, when she was just over two-thirds complete. Arizona was launched on 19 June 1915, about fifteen months after keel laying, when she weighed about 12,800 long tons (13,000 t). Movie cameras were used to film the launch to provide data for future launches. After their launches, both ships went through the necessary fitting-out period and sea trials. On Pennsylvania's trials, the ship attained a top speed of 21.75 knots (40.28 km/h; 25.03 mph), averaged 21.38 knots (39.60 km/h; 24.60 mph), and was also able to steam for twelve hours at 21.05 knots (38.98 km/h; 24.22 mph) in 50-mile-per-hour (80 km/h) winds. These attributes pleased the Navy's Board of Inspection, but Scientific American lamented the ship's low speed compared to the Italian Andrea Dorias, Russian Ganguts, and British Queen Elizabeths, which they (somewhat inaccurately) stated had top speeds of 22.5, 23, and 25 knots, respectively. Pennsylvania was commissioned on 12 June 1916, her sister ship followed on 17 October 1916.

== Ships in class ==
Construction data
Ship name	Hull no.	Builder	Laid down	Launched	Commissioned	Decommissioned	Fate
Pennsylvania	BB-38	Newport News Shipbuilding	27 October 1913	16 March 1915	12 June 1916	29 August 1946	Target ship, Operation Crossroads; scuttled 10 February 1948
Arizona	BB-39	New York Naval Shipyard	16 March 1914	19 June 1915	17 October 1916	29 December 1941	Sunk during the attack on Pearl Harbor, 7 December 1941

== Service histories ==
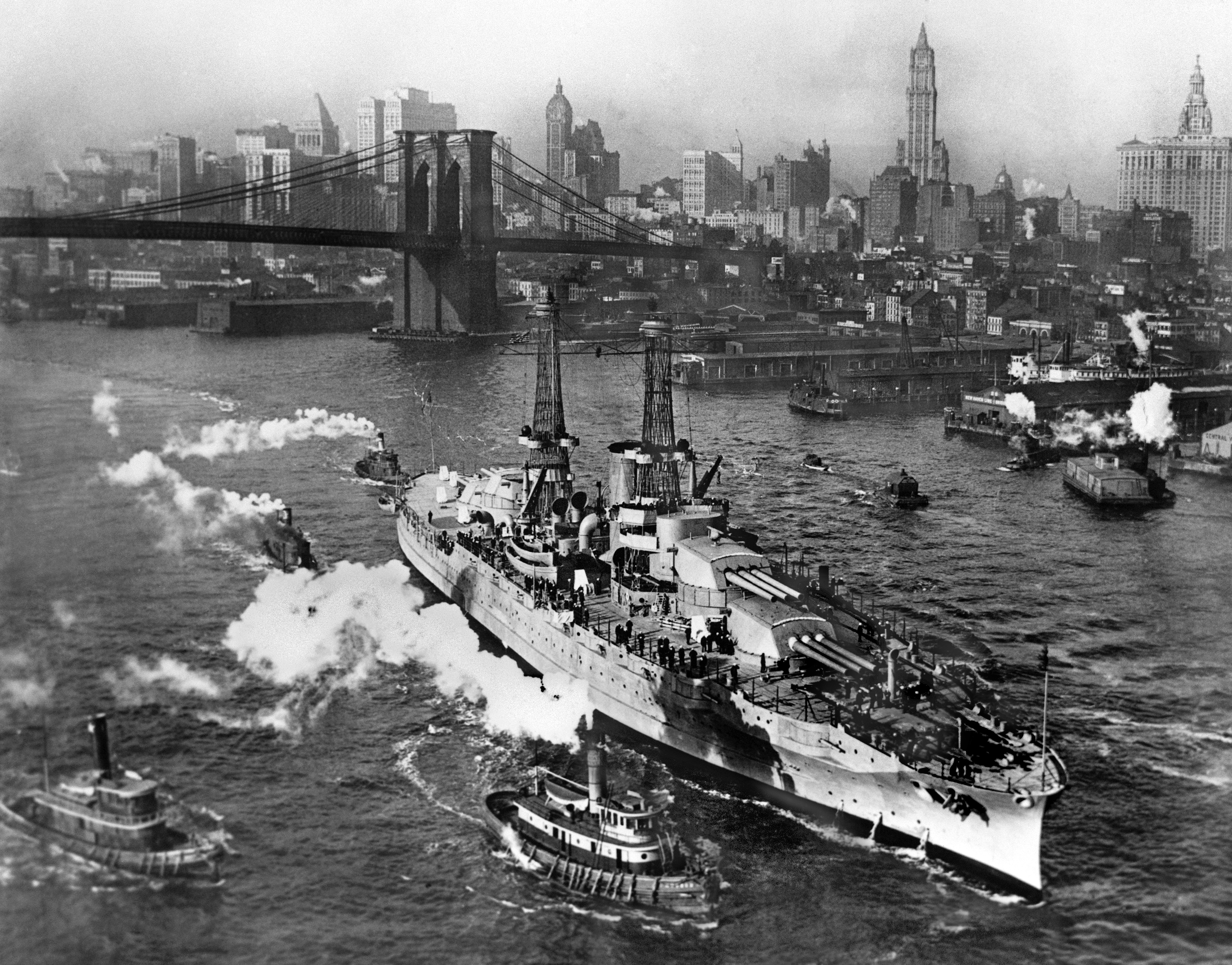
Arizona on the East River in New York City near the Brooklyn Bridge, 1918

Pennsylvania and Arizona were commissioned during the First World War, but prior to the United States' entry on the side of the Allies. During their first year, the ships were cleaned and readied for full active duty. Pennsylvania became the flagship of the Atlantic Fleet on 12 October 1916. Arizona first fired her main guns on 23 December, but issues with a stripped turbine kept the ship almost exclusively in the New York Navy Yard from December 1916 to March 1917. Both ships were based in the United States for the duration of the war, owing to a shortage of fuel oil in the United Kingdom, and only the coal-burning battleships of Battleship Division Nine were sent across the Atlantic. It was only after the armistice in 1918 that both Pennsylvania-class battleships were sent to Europe. Arizona departed first, leaving on 18 November and arriving in Portsmouth in the United Kingdom on the 30th. Pennsylvania escorted the American President Woodrow Wilson's transport, George Washington, across the Atlantic for the Paris Peace Conference in 1919. In 1921 and 1922, during the inter-war period, both ships took part in a mission to Peru and were transferred to the Pacific Fleet.

Pennsylvania and Arizona were given extensive modernizations from 1929 through 1931; the expenditure came in the fiscal year 1930. As part of the rebuilding, Pennsylvania, which had been designed as a fleet flagship, had her conning tower expanded. Aside from that, Pennsylvania and Arizona received similar treatment: the elevation of the main batteries was increased to 30°, new fire control systems on tripod masts were added, the secondary armament and directors were replaced and overhauled, eight 5-inch/25 caliber anti-aircraft guns (four per side) were mounted on the weather deck which was above the secondary anti-ship 5-inch gun battery, and their bridges were enlarged to hold elevated anti-aircraft directors. Armor additions were comparatively minimal beyond anti-torpedo bulges, which were standard additions on all major warships in this period: 1.75 to 2 inches (44 to 51 mm) of armor were added to the second armored deck, and a torpedo bulkhead was added to the engine room. The propulsion system of the two Pennsylvanias received perhaps the most attention. The boiler system was entirely replaced with six small-tube boilers and new turbines, the latter partially from the cancelled Colorado-class battleship Washington. The new machinery allowed the ships to come close to their old design speed of 21 knots (39 km/h; 24 mph), even with the added bulk of bulges: Pennsylvania made 20.89 knots and Arizona 20.7 knots on full-power trials.

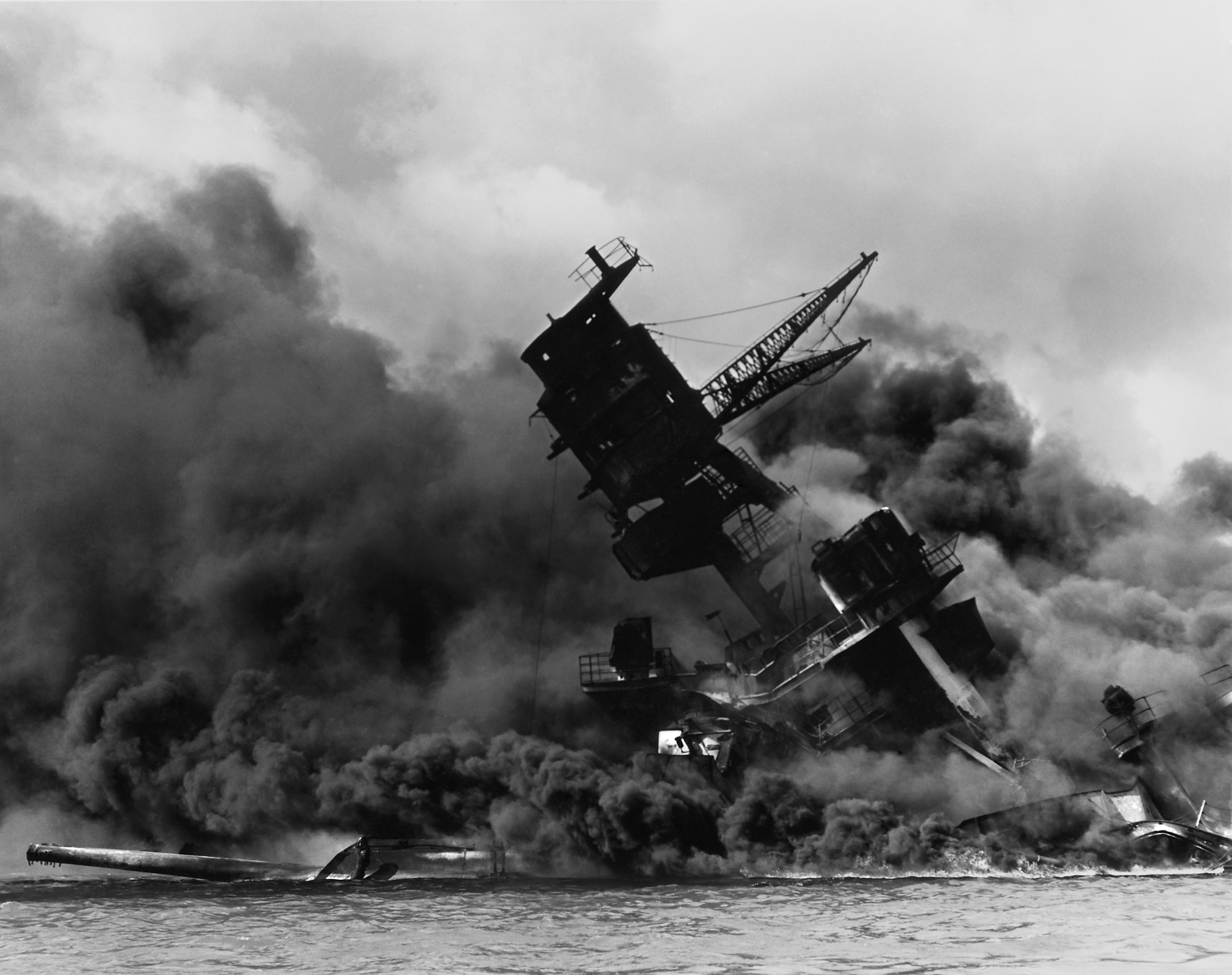
Arizona burning after the Japanese attack on Pearl Harbor

After their modernization, both ships participated in the normal activities of the fleet, including fleet problem exercises, and then joined the entire Pacific Fleet in their new base in Pearl Harbor, Hawaii, after the beginning of the Second World War in Europe. Two years later, on 7 December 1941, the Japanese attack on Pearl Harbor led to the sinking of Arizona with a direct hit from an 800 kilogram (1,757 lb) bomb to her forward ammunition magazines, causing a tremendous explosion which killed 1,177 officers and men of the 1,512 that were aboard her that morning. The attack also slightly damaged Pennsylvania, who was in dry dock at the time. Arizona's wreck was later partly salvaged and is now a war memorial.

Pennsylvania came back into service more quickly than many of the other battleships present during the attack; she left on 20 December and was under repair in San Francisco until 30 March 1942. For the next several months, Pennsylvania was stationed on the United States' West Coast, before being reassigned to Pearl Harbor as the fleet flagship for a short time (August to October). After another refit in San Francisco, which lasted until February 1943, the ship was sent to assist American forces engaged in the Aleutian Islands Campaign. During this time, Pennsylvania was nearly hit by a torpedo from Japanese submarine I-31, which was later sunk.

For the next year, Pennsylvania provided shore bombardment during the Battles of Makin, Kwajalein, Eniwetok, and Saipan, along with the Palau Islands Campaign. The ship also participated in the landings on Leyte and the Battle of Leyte Gulf. During this time, Pennsylvania was present at the last battle ever between battleships, the Battle of Surigao Strait. The ship did not fire any salvos because the Japanese vessels were turned away or sunk at long range, beyond Pennsylvania's outdated fire control but within range of other, radar-directed battleships.

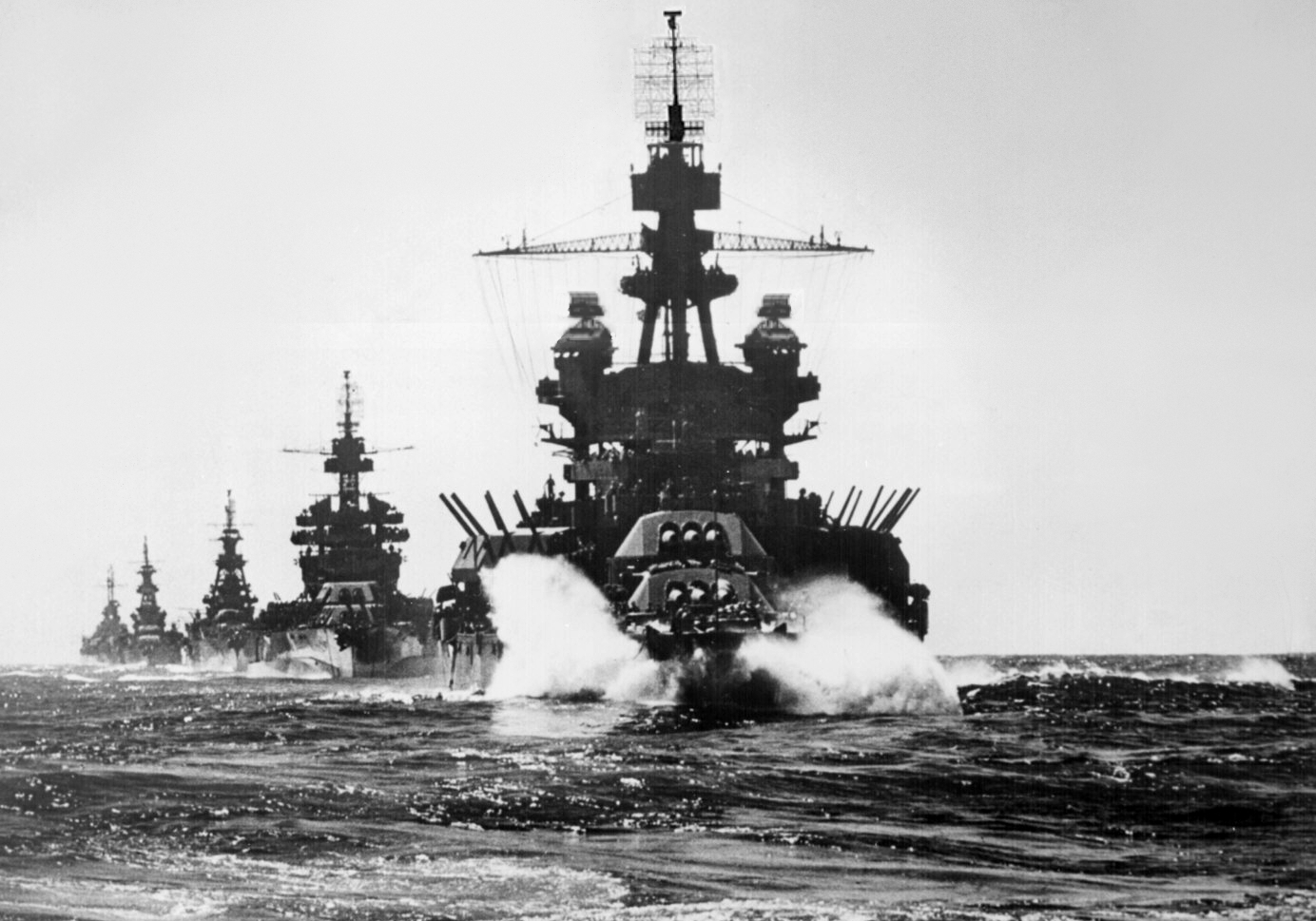
Pennsylvania leading Colorado and three cruisers into Lingayen Gulf before the invasion of Luzon (Philippines), in January 1945

In 1945, Pennsylvania was sent for another refit in San Francisco, and the guns in her main battery, worn out from the frequent shore bombardments, were replaced by those from Nevada and USS Oklahoma. After the refit’s completion in July, the ship bombarded Wake Island on 1 August en route to Okinawa, where she was struck by an air-dropped torpedo. It hit near the starboard propeller shaft, killing twenty men and knocking out three of the ship's four shafts. This area was vital, and the opened seals around the shafts led to large amounts of flooding that nearly sank the battleship. Pennsylvania was towed to shallower waters, where local repairs were made. The ship's last action was to fire at a kamikaze on 13 August; she was then towed to Guam beginning on the 18th, where temporary repairs were effected, before being sent to Navy Yard Puget Sound for a more permanent solution. Pennsylvania made it to Puget Sound on 24 October, albeit not without a great deal of trouble caused by temporary repair work.

With the Japanese surrender on 2 September, the Puget Sound repairs were limited to those necessary to ensure Pennsylvania's delivery to Bikini Atoll for atomic experiments in July 1946. The old battleship survived the tests, but was decommissioned on 29 August and used for radiological studies prior to being sunk as a target ship on 10 February 1948. Pennsylvania was struck from the Navy Vessel Register nine days later.
