= Tennessee (ship) =

Tennessee is a ship name.

It may refer to:

- SS Tennessee, several civilian steam-powered ships of the name
  - SS Tennessee (1853), a sidewheel steamer lost in 1865, that was also named Republic, USS Tennessee, CSS Tennessee, and USS Mobile
  - SS Tennessee (1865), a sidewheel steamer lost in 1870, built as a gunboat that was rebuilt as a merchantman, formerly USS Muscoota
  - Tennessee, an early 20th century ship of the Joy Steamship Company operating in the Long Island Sound
  - SS Tennessee (1921), a cargo ship torpedoed and sunk by U-617 in 1942; formerly Fredensbro
- USS Tennessee, several ships of the U.S. Navy with the name
  - USS Tennessee (1853), originally SS Tennessee, was a paddle steamer captured from the Confederacy in 1862; formerly CSS Tennessee, later becoming USS Mobile in 1864; becoming SS Republic after the war
  - USS Tennessee (1863), a Confederate ironclad captured in 1864; formerly CSS Tennessee
  - USS Tennessee (1865), a wooden screw frigate originally built and named as USS Madawaska; becoming Tennessee after the war
  - USS Tennessee (ACR-10), the lead ship of the Tennessee-class cruiser
  - USS Tennessee (BB-43), lead ship of the Tennessee-class battleship, constructed started during World War I, active in World War II
  - USS Tennessee (SSBN-734), an Ohio-class submarine
- CSS Tennessee, several naval ships of the Confederate States of America with the name
  - CSS Tennessee (1853), a steamship built in 1853 as SS Tennessee; seized by the Confederate States in 1861 becoming CSS Tennessee; captured by the Union, becoming USS Tennessee; later renamed USS Mobile in 1864; becoming SS Republic after the war
  - CSS Tennessee (1862), an Arkansas-class ironclad burned in the stocks prior to completion
  - CSS Tennessee (1863), ironclad launched in 1863, captured by the Union in 1864 and renamed USS Tennessee
- MS Tennessee or MV Tennessee, several civilian motor vessels/motorships of the name
  - MS Tennessee (1922), sunk in 1940
- Tennessee (MMSI number: 227095770), a European inland waterways cargo ship
- BBC Tennessee (IMO number: 9435026), general cargo ship
- Maersk Tennessee (IMO number: 7717169), a general cargo container ship of the Maersk Line

== See also ==
- Tennessee-class, several ship classes
