= Tennessee (disambiguation) =

Tennessee is a state in the United States of America.

Tennessee may also refer to:

== Geography of the United States ==
- Tennessee, Arkansas, an unincorporated community and census-designated place
- Tennessee, Illinois, a village
- Tennessee River, the largest tributary of the Ohio River
- Tennessee Valley, the drainage valley of the Tennessee River
- Tennessee Pass (Colorado), a high mountain pass in the Rocky Mountains
- Tanasi, sometimes spelled Tennessee, a historic Indian village

== People ==
- Tennessee Claflin (1844–1923), American suffragist and first woman, along with her sister, to open a Wall Street brokerage firm
- Tennessee Ernie Ford (1919–1991), American singer and actor
- Tennessee Thomas (born 1984), British drummer and actress, a founding member of the indie rock band The Like
- Tennessee Williams (1911–1983), American playwright

== Ships ==
- Tennessee (ship), several ships of the name
  - SS Tennessee, several ships of the name
  - CSS Tennessee, three ships of the Confederate Navy
  - USS Tennessee, four ships of the United States Navy
- Tennessee class, several ship classes
  - Tennessee-class battleship, a United States Navy class
  - Tennessee-class cruiser, a United States Navy class

== Music ==
=== Songs ===
- "Tennessee" (Arrested Development song), from the 1992 album 3 Years, 5 Months & 2 Days in the Life Of....
- "Tennessee" (Kevin Rudolf song), from the 2008 album In the City
- "Tennessee" (Bob Sinclar song), from the 2007 album Western Dream
- "Tennessee", a 2007 song by The Wreckers from the album Stand Still, Look Pretty
- "Tennessee", a 1992 song by Manic Street Preachers from the album Generation Terrorists
- "Tennessee", a 1960 charting single by Jan and Dean
- "Tennessee", a 2012 single by Modern Skirts
- "Tennessee", a 2016 song by Kiiara from the album Low Kii Savage
- "Tennessee", a 2024 song by Tommy Richman, Trevor Spitta and Zachary Moon from the album Coyote

=== Other music ===
- Tennessee Records, a record label
- Tennessee (album), a 2002 album by Lucero

== Other meanings ==
- Tennessee (film), 2008 American drama film directed by Aaron Woodley
- the title character of Tennessee Tuxedo and His Tales, a 1960s American cartoon TV series
- Tennessee Avenue (Washington, D.C.)
- University of Tennessee, Knoxville, Tennessee, United States
  - Tennessee Volunteers, this school's athletic program
- Tennessine, an element with abbreviation 'Ts'
