= Tennessee Pass (disambiguation) =

Tennessee Pass is a mountain pass between Eagle County and Lake County, Colorado, United States.

Tennessee Pass may also refer to:

- Tennessee Pass Line, a closed rail line over the pass
- Tennessee Pass (Oregon), a pass in Josephine County, Oregon, United States

== See also ==
- Tennessee (disambiguation)
- List of mountain passes
