= Hausman LLC =

- Company type: Private
- Industry: Public relations, Architecture, Engineering, Construction
- Founded: 2008
- Founder: Tami Hausman
- Headquarters: New York City
- Area served: Worldwide
- Key people: Tami Hausman (Founder and President); Troy Vázquez-Cain (Vice President)
- Website: hausmanllc.com

Hausman LLC, also known as Hausman Communications, is an American public relations firm based in Manhattan, New York City. Founded in 2008 by public relations professional Tami Hausman, the firm specializes in communications for architecture, engineering, construction, and design-related organizations.

== History ==
Hausman Communications was formed as a Limited Liability Corporation in 2008. Initially launched by Tami Hausman and another colleague, Hausman bought her co-founder out after 10 months. In an article about foundational business partnerships Hausman cited growth-stage differences of opinion about the company's direction and operational model as reasons for the buyout. Hausman has served as President since the firm's inception and continues to oversee daily operations. Troy Vázquez-Cain, who joined the company in 2012, became Vice President in February 2016.

After Hurricane Sandy, Hausman LLC served as press liaison for a construction company tasked with restoring power to Liberty Island, including The Statue of Liberty. The firm's founder has also received significant media attention for her engagement in social and urban development issues.

== Recent Clients & Projects ==
=== Natoli Construction ===
Hausman LLC represents Natoli Construction, a New Jersey construction firm involved in post Hurricane Sandy restoration repairs of infrastructure. Hausman handled PR for Natoli as the latter completed work on The Statue of Liberty.

=== Rogers Partners ===
In 2014, Hausman LLC spearheaded PR for the Rogers Partners designed Henderson-Hopkins School in Baltimore, MD. The first new public school built in East Baltimore in the last 20 years, the project was developed to be the central revitalization piece of the economically troubled neighborhood where parts of the American TV series The Wire were filmed. The development was overseen by East Baltimore Development, Inc. and operated by a partnership between Johns Hopkins University and Morgan State University.

=== Francis Cauffman ===
Francis Cauffman, a Philadelphia and New York-based architecture and design firm also represented by Hausman, was recently featured in The Wall Street Journal addressing a design problem for construction sheds. The conceptual re-imagining of urban infrastructure is typical of the urban design challenges Hausman's clients tend to undertake.

== Philosophy ==
In a recent lecture to Society for Marketing Professional Services New York chapter and regional affiliates, Hausman described the firm's primary role as that of "establishing third-party credibility for clients." For the purposes of evaluating a given client's coverage status, the firm claims a proprietary exposure indexing metric known as the "Hausman Index."

== Social issues ==
Hausman has drawn attention to her firm by leveraging extensive personal and professional connections to generate visibility for women in AEC, LGBTQ rights, and other civic issues. She formally served as an advisory board member to the Beverly Willis Architecture Foundation, a 501(c)(3) which seeks to bring recognition to "women's contributions to the built environment."

A resident of Manhattan's Greenwich Village neighborhood, Hausman has been a public proponent of the municipal and community-level benefits inherent in utilizing smaller real estate brokerage firms. In a 2011 New York Times piece she is quoted as touting the "local expertise" and historical architectural knowledge available to smaller brokers in New York City.

Hausman, who has a PhD in Art History from New York University’s Institute of Fine Arts has also provided consultation, written and/or edited books and articles for the New York real estate community.

== See also ==
- Stolzman, Henry & Daniel, ed. Tami Hausman (2004). "Synagogue Architecture in America: Faith, Spirit, and Identity". Images Publishing. ISBN 1864700742
