= David Mitchell (pilot boat) =

New York Pilot boat

History

United States
- Name: David Mitchell
- Namesake: David Mitchell, father of James Mitchell
- Owner: New York Pilots
- Operator: James Mitchell (1846-1848), Thomas Dexter (1876-1881), Alex Cocshran (1860)
- Builder: John A. Robb shipyard
- Launched: September 5, 1846
- Out of service: November 12, 1875
- Fate: Sold

General characteristics
- Class & type: schooner
- Tonnage: 36 tons TM
- Length: 52 ft 8 in (16.05 m)
- Beam: 18 ft 2 in (5.54 m)
- Depth: 7 ft 0 in (2.13 m)
- Propulsion: Sail

The David Mitchell was a 19th-century Sandy Hook pilot boat built in 1846 at Baltimore, Maryland, for a group of New York Pilots. She was launched at the John A. Robb shipyard in East Baltimore. She was sold to the Pensacola, Florida pilot fleet in 1875.

== Construction and service ==
The pilot-boat schooner David Mitchell, No. 5, was built in Baltimore, Maryland and was launched on September 5, 1846, at the John A. Robb shipyard in East Baltimore. The boat was built for James Mitchell and other New York pilots. She was named David Mitchell, in honor of James's father, David Mitchell. After her launch, as customary, her sail loft was set with a table of refreshments for the invited quests, which were the builders of the vessel and others. She arrived in Norfolk, New York on 2 October 1846.

In November 1849, she was called the pilot boat David L. Mitchell, No. 6., that spoke to the bark Satisfaction, of North Shields, England, bound for New York with 100 passengers.

In 1860, the David Mitchell, No. 5, was one of only twenty-one New York and New Jersey pilot boats in service.

On September 14, 1860, the pilot-boat David Mitchell, No. 5, went to the assistance of the brig Loranna, from Cienfuegos, Cuba, which had drifted out of Sandy Hook. She placed on board the pilot-boat two of her pilots, Thomas Conkling and Walter Brewer and one seaman. Alexander Cockran was in charge of the pilot-boat. The Loranna, was then brought safely to anchor.

On October 10, 1860, New York Sandy Hook Pilot Alex Cocsran, of the pilot boat D. Mitchell, No. 1, signed a statement along with other pilots, that he was satisfied with the representation he had received from the New York Board of Commissioners of Pilots.

The David Mitchell, was registered as a pilot schooner with the Record of American and Foreign Shipping, from 1876 to 1881. Her owners were a group of New York Pilots, belonging to the port of New York. Captain Thomas Dexter was the ship master. Her dimensions were 52.8 feet (16.1 m) in length; 18.2 ft (5.5 m) breadth of beam; 7 ft (2.1 m) in depth; and 36 tons burthen.

In 1874, the David Mitchell, No. 3, was listed with the New Jersey pilot boats. Thomas Dexter was the captain of the boat. Her boat number changed to "3" to distinguish her from other New York and New Jersey pilot-boats.

On January 15, 1875, the pilot boat David Mitchell, No. 3, was off Barnegat, when a crewmember drowned after being knocked overboard when reefing the jib.

== End of service ==
On November 12, 1875, the pilot boat David Michell, became unseaworthy and was withdrawn from New York pilot service and sold to the Pensacola, Florida fleet.

In April 1879, she was listed as a Pensacola pilot boat, with Captain Caro, who spotted a humpback whale about sixty-three feet (19 m) long. On February 10, 1881, the pilot boat David Mitchell, was blown ashore in Pensacola and lost her rigging from the collision. She was floated with the assistance of a steam tug.

== See also ==
- List of Northeastern U. S. Pilot Boats
