= John A. Robb =

American shipbuilder (1792–1867)

- Born: John Alexander Robb; June 1, 1792; Colony of Nova Scotia
- Died: January 28, 1867 (aged 74); Baltimore, Maryland, U.S.
- Resting place: Green Mount Cemetery
- Occupation: Shipbuilder
- Spouse: Cornelia Cheney
- Children: 8

John Alexander Robb (June 1, 1792 – January 28, 1867), was a 19th-century shipbuilder at Fell's Point, Baltimore. He had his own shipyard, which became noted for fast sailing Baltimore Clippers. He was an apprenticeship under shipbuilder Henry Eckford. Abolitionist Frederick Douglass, as a young man, worked at the John A. Robb shipyard as a caulker for several years. Robb built the steamship Pulaski, that was lost off Cape Lookout in the 1838 Steamship Pulaski disaster. Robb died in Baltimore, Maryland, in 1867.

== Early life ==
John A. Robb was born on June 1, 1792 in Nova Scotia, Canada. He was the son of Captain John Alexander Robb (1869-1818) and Abigail Tupper (1771-1841). Robb moved to New York, with his parents, when he was twelve years old (1804). He married Cornelia Cheney in 1818 in New York City and had eight children. His son, Eliakim Tupper Robb (1831-1908) worked for Montgomery C. Meigs in 1856 as a draughtsman, and in 1861 was in charge of the droughting departments of the iron shipbuilding company Reaney, Son & Archbold and the Vulcan Iron Works in 1892. Another son, John A. Robb (1828-1910), Jr. served one term in the Maryland House of Delegates in 1868 and then became a Baltimore City Register for 14 consecutive terms.

== Career ==
In New York, John A. Robb served as an apprenticeship under shipbuilder Henry Eckford where he learned the shipbuilding business and later became one of Eckford's most trusted shipbuilders. During the War of 1812 he enlisted in the United States Army. After the war Robb and his family moved to East Baltimore, Maryland in 1825 and became the foreman in the construction of the frigate Baltimore, built for the government of Brazil.

Robb established a shipyard in Fell's Point, Baltimore on Thames Street, next to the Patapsco River, which flows into the Chesapeake Bay. It was called the John A. Robb & Co. or just "Robb's Yard." At this shipyard, he built most of his vessels including ships, steamships, brigs and pilot boats (see list below). The shipyard became noted for fast sailing Baltimore Clippers. Abolitionist Frederick Douglass, as a young man, worked at the shipyard as a caulker for several years. Howard I. Chapelle, in his book The Search For Speed Under Sail, identified boats connected with the slave trade and built at John A Robb's shipyard at Fells Point, while Douglass was working there. These boats include the schooners Viper (1836) and the Clara (1838).

On July 4, 1828, Robb acquired payment provided by the Pennsylvania, Delaware and Maryland Steamboat Company for the best model of a steam boat.

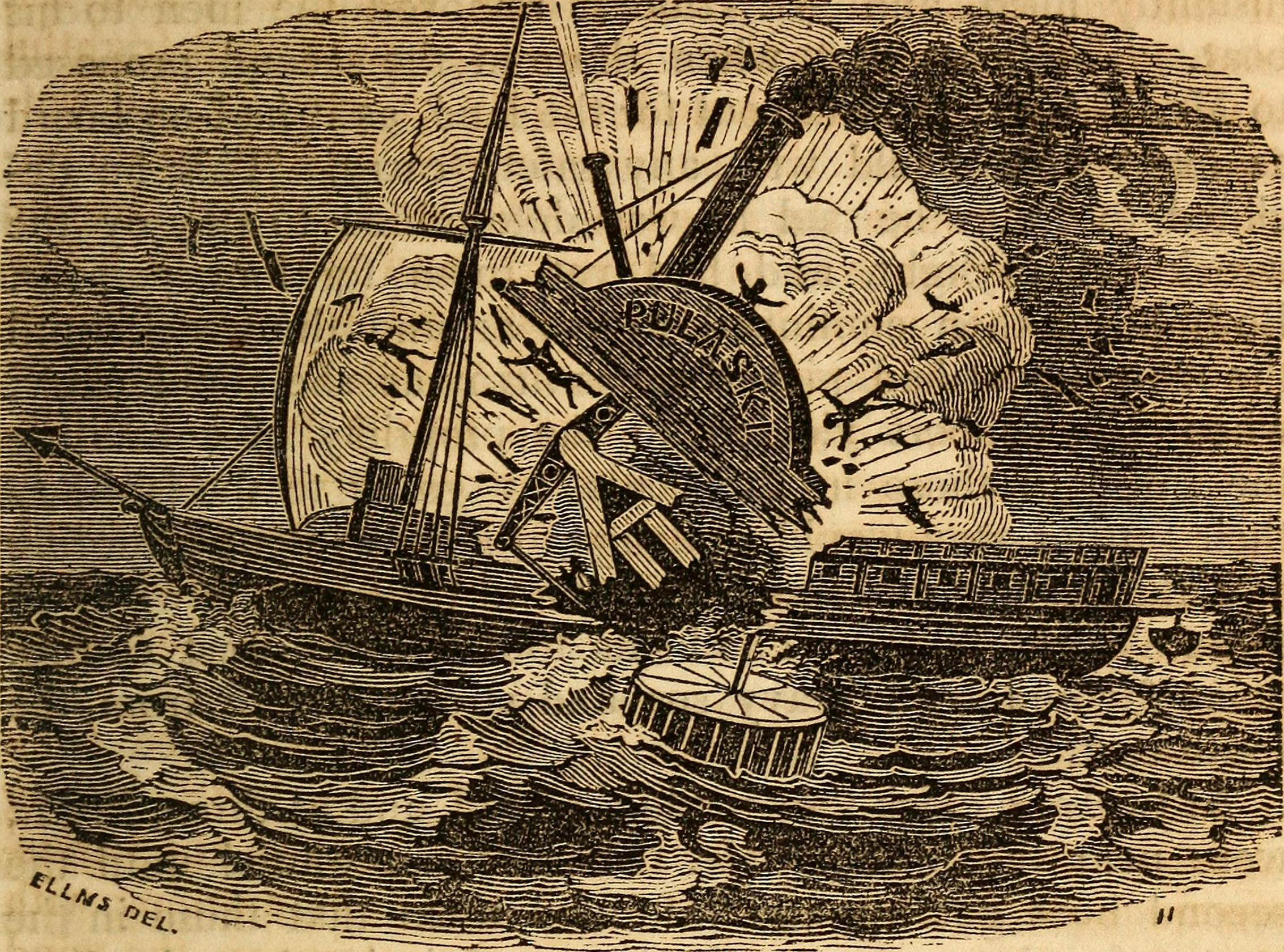
The steamship Pulaski was built by John A. Robb. She exploded in the Steamship Pulaski disaster.

On July 19, 1837, John A. Robb & Co. built a steam dredge boat for the United States Government for deepening the harbor at Ocracoke, North Carolina. In August 1837, he built the barqueJohn A. Robb for New Orleans pilots. Captain Bennett was in command.

In 1837 he built the steamship Pulaski for the Savanah & Charleston Steam Packet Company. She was lost off Cape Lookout on the coast of North Carolina in 1838, in what was called the Steamship Pulaski disaster, when her starboard boiler exploded.

In 1846, Robb built the New York pilot boat schooner David Mitchell, No. 5. She was launched on September 5, 1846, at the John A. Robb shipyard. The boat was built for James Mitchell and other New York pilots.

Robb built the hull for the steamship Republic in 1849 for the Pacific Mail Steamship Company of New York. She was a packet ship that ran between Baltimore and Charleston. Her dimensions were 207 ft. length on deck; 30 ft. breadth of beam; 18.6 ft. depth of hold and 800-tons burthen.

By 1850, his holdings included his Baltimore shipyard that was worth over $18,000.

In 1853, Robb built the 567-ton clipper ship Frigate Bird for C. H. Cummings & Co., of Philadelphia. The Bird traveled to Australia under the command of Captain Perry C. Cope.

On August 24, 1853, the 1,200-ton sidewheel steamship Tennessee was launched from the John A. Robb shipyard for the Baltimore and Southern Packet Company's Line, which owns the Palmetto built by the Robb shipyard. She was later renamed the USS Mobile in 1864 and then SS Republic in 1865. She sank in a hurricane off the coast of Georgia in October 1865.

In 1855, Robb built the William Jenkins, which was one of the first side-wheel steamships of the M. & M. Trans. Co.

He retired for the business in 1865. He was a prominent member of the Saint Andrew's Society of the State of New York and belonged to the Burns Club.

== Death ==
John A. Robb died, at age 74, on January 28, 1867, at his residence in Baltimore, Maryland. The funeral took place at his residence and was conducted by Rev. Rodman of Philadelphia. He was buried at the Green Mount Cemetery in Baltimore.

== See also ==
- List of Northeastern U. S. Pilot Boats
