= CSS Tennessee =

Three ships in the Confederate States Navy were named CSS Tennessee

- CSS Tennessee (1861) was a steamship, built in 1853 and seized by the Confederate States in 1861; she was recaptured by the Union in the Battle of New Orleans and commissioned into the United States Navy as USS Tennessee (1853); she was later renamed USS Mobile when the ironclad CSS Tennessee (1863) was captured in 1864
- CSS Tennessee (1862) was burned at the stocks prior to completion
- CSS Tennessee (1863) was an ironclad launched in 1863, commissioned in 1864 and was captured at the Battle of Mobile Bay, and renamed USS Tennessee (1863)

== See also ==
- SS Tennessee
- USS Tennessee
- Tennessee (disambiguation)
