= SS Tennessee =

A number of steamships were named Tennessee, including:

- SS Tennessee (1853), a sidewheel steamer lost in 1865, that was also the Republic, USS Tennessee, CSS Tennessee, USS Mobile
- SS Tennessee (1865), a sidewheel steamer lost in 1870, built as a gunboat that was rebuilt as a merchantman, formerly USS Muscoota
- SS Tennessee (Joy Line), an early 20th century ship of the Joy Steamship Company operating in the Long Island Sound
- SS Tennessee (1921), a cargo ship torpedoed and sunk by U-617 in 1942; formerly Fredensbro

== See also ==
- CSS Tennessee
- USS Tennessee
- Tennessee (disambiguation)
