= USS Tennessee =

Six ships of the United States Navy have been named USS Tennessee in honor of the 16th state.

- SS Republic (1853), originally Tennessee, was a paddlewheel steamer captured from the Confederacy at New Orleans on 2 April 1862.
- CSS Tennessee (1863) was a Confederate ironclad captured from the Confederacy in the Battle of Mobile Bay on 16 February 1864.
- USS Tennessee (1865) was a wooden screw frigate originally built and named as Madawaska.
- USS Tennessee (ACR-10) was the lead ship of her class of armored cruiser.
- USS Tennessee (BB-43) was the lead ship of her class of battleship, was damaged in the Attack on Pearl Harbor, repaired and saw action in the Pacific during World War II, broken up 1959.
- USS Tennessee (SSBN-734) is an Ohio-class submarine

== See also ==
- Tennessee-class battleship of the U.S. Navy in the Interwar period
- Tennessee-class cruiser of the U.S. Navy at the turn of the 20th century
- SS Tennessee
- CSS Tennessee
- Tennessee (disambiguation)
