= Tennessee class =

Tennessee class is the name of several ship classes.

It may refer to:

- Tennessee-class battleship, a United States Navy class from the interwar period between WWI and WWII
- Tennessee-class cruiser, a United States Navy class from the turn of the 20th century

== See also ==
- Tennessee (ship), several ships of the name
