= Steamship Pulaski disaster =

1838 ship sinking in North Carolina, US

Coordinates: 35.730°N 74.755°W

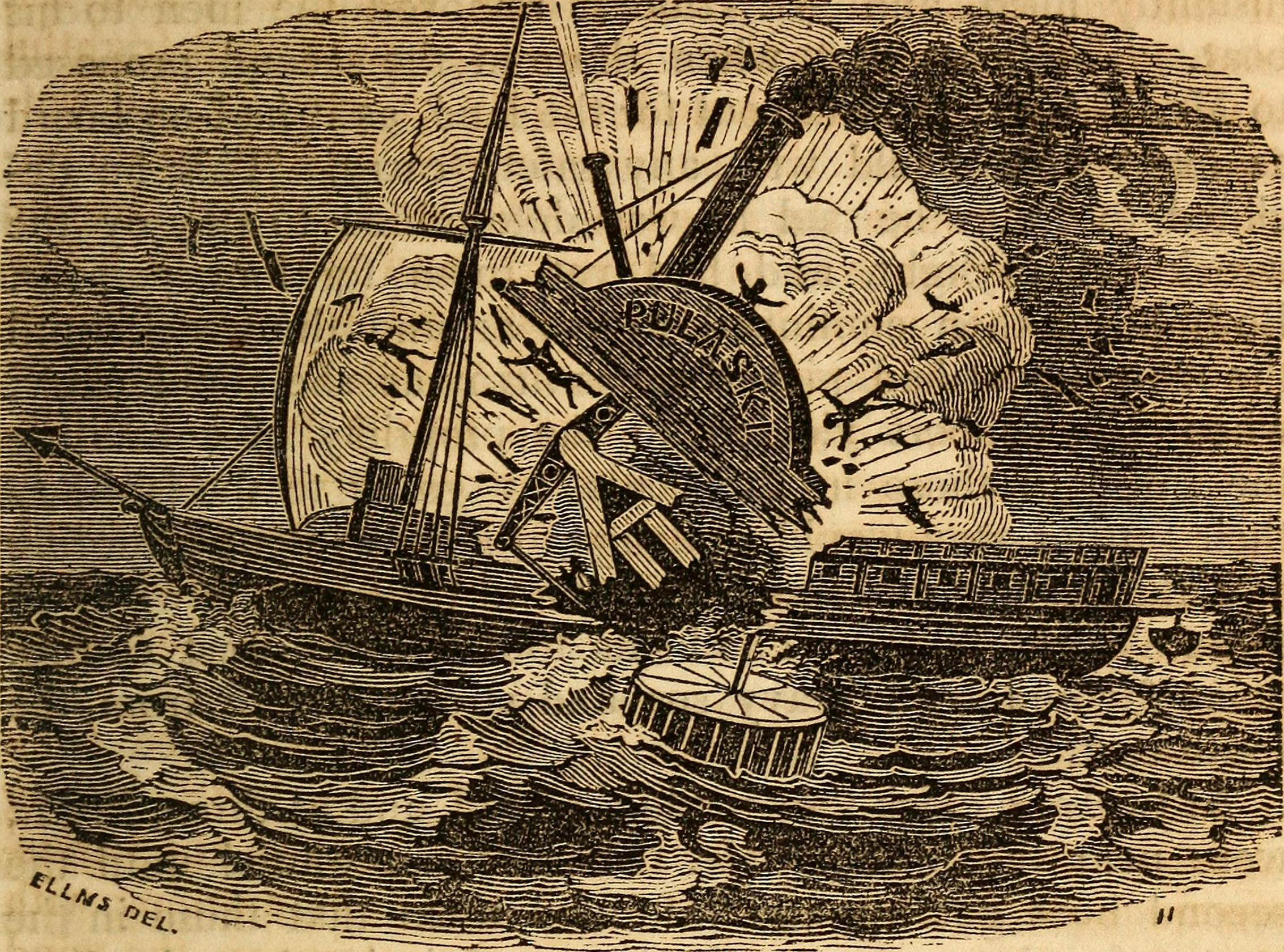
- The Pulaski explodes; from page 170 of the book The Tragedy of the Seas; or, Sorrow on the ocean, lake, and river, from shipwreck, plague, fire and famine (1848) by Charles Elms

History

United States
- Name: Pulaski
- Builder: John A. Robb & Co.
- Launched: 1837
- Out of service: 1838
- Fate: Sunk by internal explosion 14 June 1838
- Notes: Approx. 128 lost; 59 saved

General characteristics
- Class & type: Steam packet

The Steamship Pulaski disaster was the term given to the June 14, 1838, explosion on board the American steam packet Pulaski, which caused her to sink 40 miles (64 km) off the coast of North Carolina with the loss of two-thirds of her passengers and crew. About 59 persons survived, and 128 were lost. Her starboard boiler exploded about 11 p.m., causing crippling damage as the ship was traveling from Savannah, Georgia, to Baltimore, Maryland; she sank in 45 minutes.

== The disaster ==
The packet steamer Pulaski, bound for Baltimore, Maryland, departed Charleston, South Carolina on June 14, 1838, under Captain DuBois, with a crew of 37 and 131 passengers on board.

That night at about 11 p.m., when the ship was 40 miles (64 km) off the coast of North Carolina, the starboard boiler exploded, destroying the middle of the ship. Some passengers were killed immediately. Knocked out by the explosion, the first mate Hibbard assessed the small boats and put three in the water. Because two had been overexposed to sunlight, they were in poor condition, and one sank immediately. Ten persons got in one boat and eleven, including Hibbard, in another. They started rowing away from the sinking ship, which went down in 45 minutes. Others clung to makeshift floats made from the wreckage.

At the end of 1838, an inquiry into the incident found that "the engineers had improperly operated the boilers on the Pulaski and caused the explosion."

== Survivors ==
Among the 128 persons lost in the sinking was William B. Rochester, a former member of the United States House of Representatives from New York, and Jane (Cresswell) Lamar, wife of banker and shipper Gazaway Bugg Lamar of Savannah, five of their six children, and a niece. Her husband and their eldest son Charles Augustus Lafayette Lamar were the only members of the immediate family to survive.

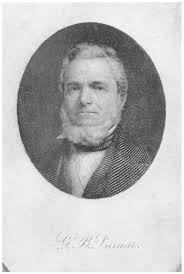
Gazaway Bugg Lamar

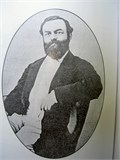
Charles Augustus Lafayette Lamar

The Delaware Gazette newspaper later ran a story about the fortunes of two alleged survivors: Charles Ridge, left penniless after the shipwreck, became engaged to heiress Miss Onslow, whom he had saved from the shipwreck. However, neither of these persons was listed among the survivors in a June 27 North-Carolina Standard article published two weeks after the wreck.

== Search for wreckage ==
In January 2018 divers reported that they believed they had found wreckage of Pulaski 40 nautical miles (74 km; 46 mi) off the North Carolina coast. This was confirmed several months later, when salvage divers recovered items from the wreckage.

== Depiction in media ==
- The Pulaski disaster figures prominently in Eugenia Price's 1985 novel To See Your Face Again, the second book of her Savannah Quartet.
- Surviving Savannah is a historical fiction novel based on this tragedy written by Patti Callahan, published in 2021.
- The Pulaski disaster was the subject of an August 2021 episode of Expedition Unknown.
