= Arkansas-class ironclad =

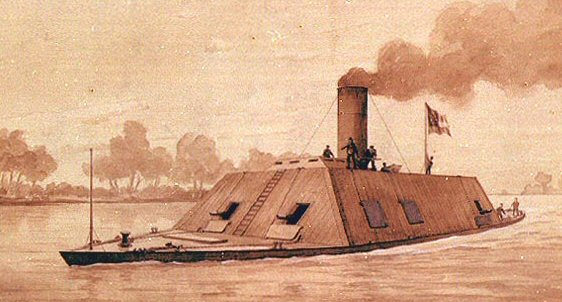
- The C. S. S. Arkansas by R. G. Skerrett

Class overview
- Name: Arkansas-class ironclad
- Builders: John T. Shirley, Memphis, Tennessee
- Operators: (Confederate States of America) Confederate States Navy
- Built: 1861–1862
- In service: 1862
- Planned: 2
- Completed: 1
- Lost: 2

General characteristics
- Type: Casemate ironclad
- Length: 165 ft (50.3 m)
- Beam: 35 ft (10.7 m)
- Draft: 11 ft 6 in (3.51 m)
- Installed power: 2 propellers
- Propulsion: 2 Steam engines
- Speed: 7 knots (13 km/h; 8.1 mph)
- Complement: 200 officers and enlisted men
- Armament: Designed for 6–8 guns

The Arkansas-class ironclads were a class of two casemate ironclads ordered by the Confederate States Navy in 1861 to operate in the Western and Trans-Mississippi theaters of the American Civil War. Both were later destroyed to prevent Union capture.

== Ships ==
Construction data
| Ship name | Builder | Laid down | Launched | Commissioned | Fate |
|---|---|---|---|---|---|
| CSS Arkansas | John T. Shirley, Memphis, Tennessee | October 1861 | 22 April 1862 | 26 May 1862 | Destroyed to prevent capture, 6 August 1862 |
| CSS Tennessee | John T. Shirley, Memphis, Tennessee | October 1861 | — | | Burned to prevent capture, 5 June 1862 |

== Bibliography ==
- Bisbee, Saxon T. (2018). Engines of Rebellion: Confederate Ironclads and Steam Engineering in the American Civil War. Tuscaloosa, Alabama: University of Alabama Press. ISBN 978-0-81731-986-1.
- Canney, Donald L. (2015). The Confederate Steam Navy 1861-1865. Atglen, Pennsylvania: Schiffer Publishing. ISBN 978-0-7643-4824-2.
- Silverstone, Paul H. (2006). Civil War Navies 1855–1883. The U.S. Navy Warship Series. New York: Routledge. ISBN 0-415-97870-X.
- Still, William N. Jr. (1985) [1971]. Iron Afloat: The Story of the Confederate Armorclads. Columbia, South Carolina: University of South Carolina Press. ISBN 0-87249-454-3.
