= Joy Steamship Company =

Defunct American steamship line

The Joy Steamship Company (also the Joy Line) was an independent steamship line operating in Long Island Sound in the early decades of the 20th century. It was named for its owner Allan Joy.

Founded in 1899, the Joy Line initially competed with the New Haven Railroad for transport between New York City and the ports of New England. By 1902, the New Haven had pressured other steamship lines not to lease their ships to the Joy (for example, by offering free annual passes along their rail to captains refusing Joy offers) and offered to carry American Sugar for almost nothing rather than allow the Joy to benefit from its traffic. In consequence, the Joy was forced to a traffic agreement, raising its rates to equivalence with the railroad's and limiting itself to local trade between New York and Providence, Rhode Island. The entrance of the Enterprise Line along the same route led the New Haven to purchase the Joy Line in December, 1905. The competition featured in the antitrust case against the New Haven in 1915.

== Ships of the Joy Line ==
- SS Aransas (purchased from the S. Pacific SS Co.)
- SS Martinique (leased from the Florida E. Coast Co.)
- SS City of Key West
- SS Tennessee
