= East Baltimore Midway, Baltimore =

Neighborhood in Baltimore

Coordinates: 39°18′53″N 76°36′13″W

East Baltimore Midway
- Neighborhood of Baltimore
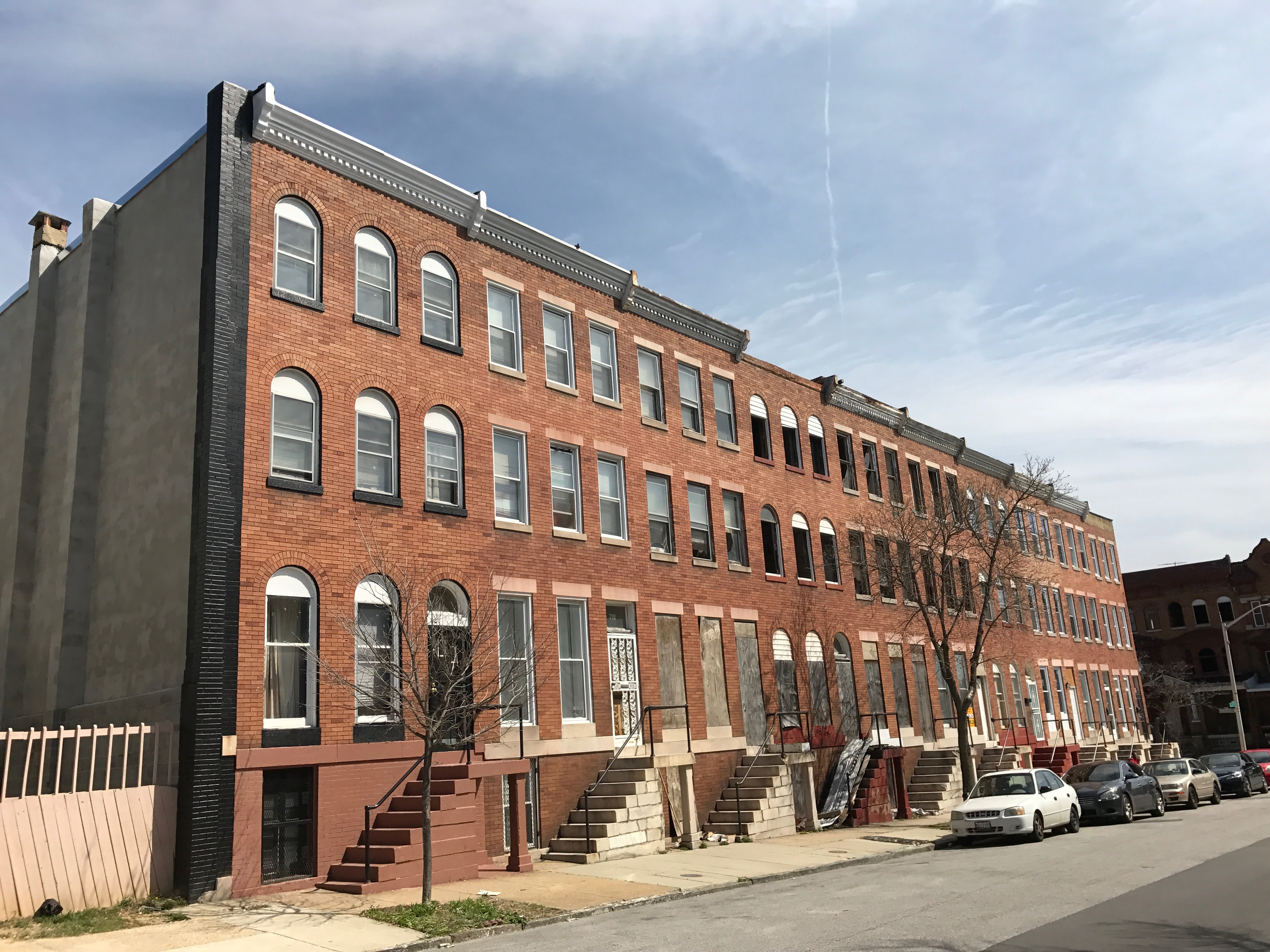
- Rowhouses on the 600 block of E. 21st Street in the East Baltimore Midway section of Baltimore

- Location within Baltimore Location within Maryland Location within the United States
- Country: United States
- State: Maryland
- City: Baltimore
- Time zone: UTC−5 (Eastern)
  - Summer (DST): UTC−4 (EDT)
- Area Codes: 410, 443, 667

East Baltimore Midway is a neighborhood in the Eastern district of Baltimore, Maryland. Its boundaries are the south side of 25th Street, the east side of Greenmount Avenue, the west side of Harford Road, and the north side of North Avenue.

The neighborhood lies East of Barclay, North of Oliver, South of Coldstream-Homestead-Montebello, and West of Clifton Park. Though the area was once considered middle-class, it has in the 20th century experienced economic depression, housing abandonment, and increased crime. The neighborhood was affected by the Baltimore riot of 1968. Its residents are largely poor and working-class African Americans.
