= Tennessee-class battleship =

Dreadnought battleship class of the United States Navy

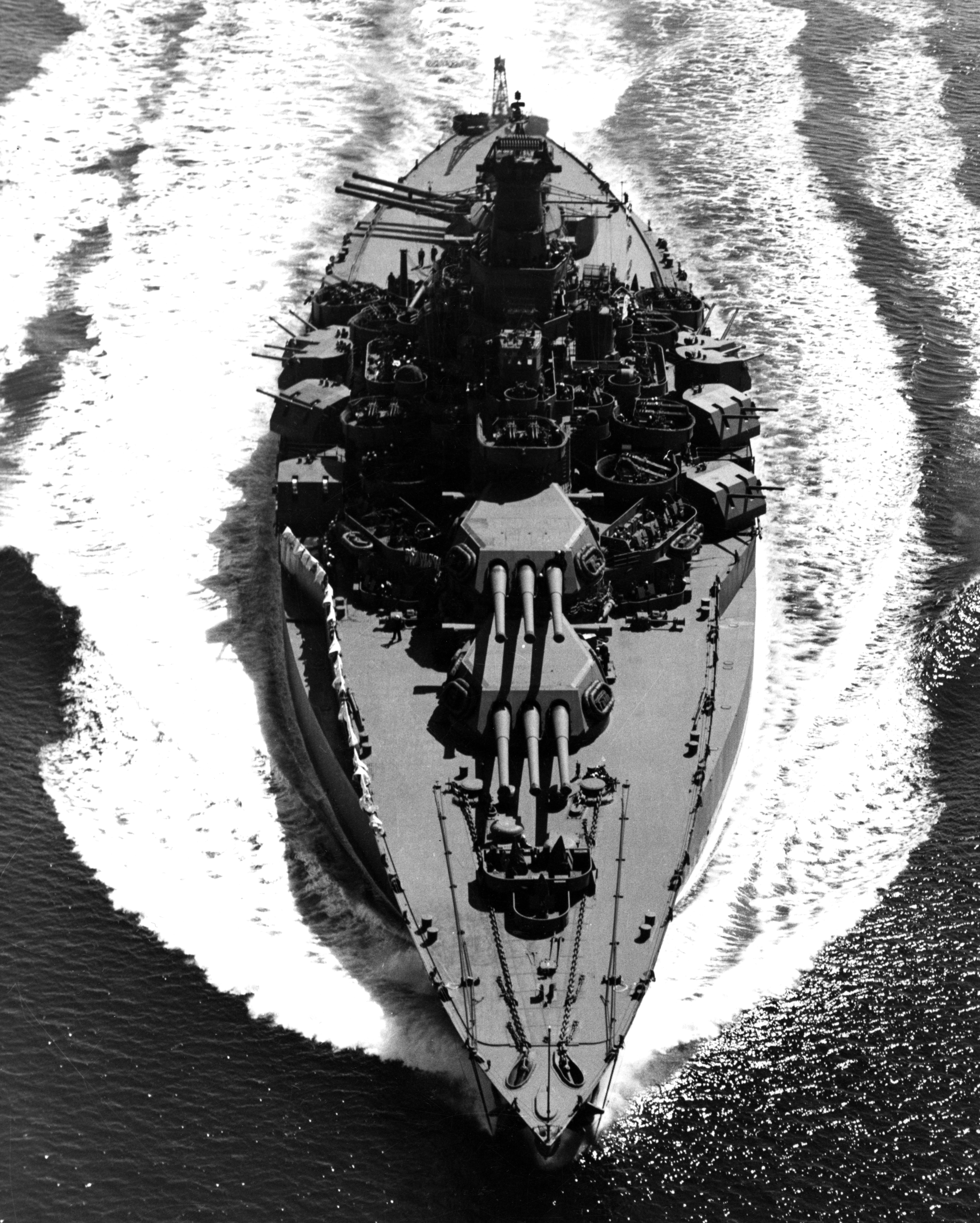
- USS Tennessee (BB-43), underway on 12 May 1943.

Class overview
- Name: Tennessee-class battleship
- Builders: New York Naval Shipyard; Mare Island Naval Shipyard
- Operators: United States Navy
- Preceded by: New Mexico class
- Succeeded by: Colorado class
- Built: 1916–1921
- In commission: 1920–1947
- Planned: 2
- Completed: 2
- Retired: 2

General characteristics (as built)
- Type: Dreadnought battleship
- Displacement: Normal: 32,300 long tons (32,818 t); Full load: 33,190 long tons (33,723 t)
- Length: 600 ft (182.9 m) lwl; 624 ft (190.2 m) loa
- Beam: 97 ft 5 in (29.7 m)
- Draft: 30 ft 2 in (9.2 m)
- Installed power: 8 × Babcock & Wilcox boilers; 28,600 shp (21,300 kW)
- Propulsion: 2 × Westinghouse electric generators; 4 × electric motors; 4 × screw propellers
- Speed: 21 knots (39 km/h; 24 mph)
- Range: 8,000 nmi (15,000 km; 9,200 mi) at 10 knots (19 km/h; 12 mph)
- Complement: 57 officers; 1,026 enlisted
- Armament: 12 × 14 in (356 mm) guns; 14 × 5 in (127 mm) guns; 4 × 3 in (76 mm) guns; 2 × 21 in (533 mm) torpedo tubes
- Armor: Belt: 8–13.5 in (203–343 mm); Barbettes: 13 in (330 mm); Turret face: 18 in (457 mm); Conning tower: 16 in (406 mm); Decks: 3.5 in (89 mm)

The Tennessee class consisted of two dreadnought battleships—Tennessee and California—built for the United States Navy in the late 1910s, part of the "standard" series. The class was in most respects a repeat of the preceding New Mexico class, with the primary improvements being a significantly strengthened underwater protection system, and increased elevation of the main battery guns to allow them to fire at much greater ranges. They carried the same main battery of twelve 14-inch (356 mm) guns in four triple turrets, and had the same top speed of 21 knots (39 km/h; 24 mph). Both ships served in the Pacific Fleet for the duration of their careers, which included an extensive training program during the interwar period of the 1920s and 1930s.

Both ships were present in Battleship Row in Pearl Harbor when the Japanese attacked on 7 December 1941; California was torpedoed and sunk but Tennessee was only minimally damaged. California was refloated and both ships were heavily rebuilt between 1942 and 1944. The pair thereafter saw extensive service as bombardment vessels supporting the island-hopping campaign across the central Pacific. Tennessee took part in the Aleutian Islands campaign in mid-1943, the Gilbert and Marshall Islands campaign in late 1943 and early 1944, and the Mariana and Palau Islands campaign in mid-1944, by which time California had returned to the fleet as well.

They both took part in the Philippines campaign in late 1944, and were present at the Battle of Surigao Strait on 24 October, the final battleship engagement in history. A refit for Tennessee kept her from participating in the Battle of Lingayen Gulf in January 1945, where California was hit by a kamikaze, which in turn kept her from supporting Marine Corps troops during the Battle of Iwo Jima. Tennessee was heavily engaged in the fighting there and the subsequent Battle of Okinawa, where she, too, was hit by a kamikaze. The two ships spent the rest of the war patrolling the East China Sea until the official Japanese surrender in September. After briefly participating in the occupation of Japan, they were recalled to the United States and assigned to the Atlantic Reserve Fleet. They remained there until 1959, when they were sold for scrap.

== Design ==
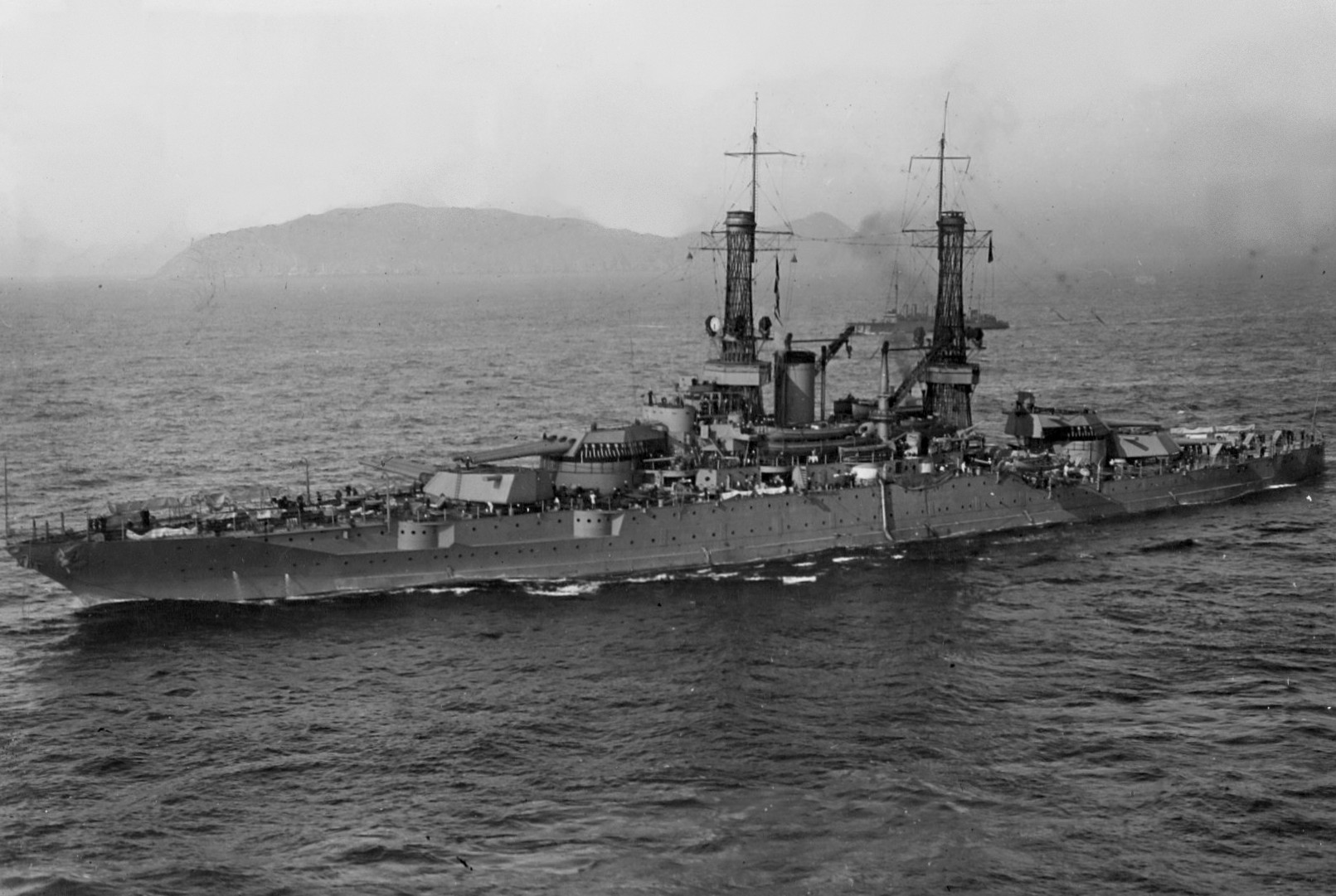
New Mexico, the basis for the Tennessee design

Design work on the Tennessee class, initially referred to as "Battleship 1916", began on 14 January 1915; the design staff used the preceding New Mexico class as a starting point. The General Board wanted to build a battleship that departed from the standard-type battleship series, particularly in terms of armor protection against the latest 15-inch (381 mm) guns being fielded by European navies. They were opposed to simply developing the standard series, which incorporated relatively minor incremental improvements, but Secretary of the Navy, Josephus Daniels, overruled them and ordered that "Battleship 1916" would effectively repeat the New Mexico design with limited improvements.

At the same time that European navies had begun to adopt larger guns, they also began to develop longer-ranged torpedoes that could reach well into the expected battle distances of the day, 10,000 to 14,000 yards (9,100 to 12,800 m). Therefore, the new ship's ability to resist underwater attack—naval mines in addition to torpedoes—became a chief concern of the designers. To ensure the ship could survive an underwater explosion, they decided to incorporate four torpedo bulkheads, which created four voids. Of these, the inner pair would be filled with either water or fuel oil, which would absorb the pressure and gas of the explosion. This system proved to be effective and it was used in many subsequent battleship designs.

The ships were authorized on 3 March 1915, while design work was still ongoing; tests on the torpedo bulkhead system were completed only in February 1916. In the meantime, work had already begun on the next class, initially designated "Battleship 1917", which became the Colorado class. This class was essentially a repeat of the Tennessee design, the only major change was the adoption of larger 16 in (406 mm) guns in place of the 14 in (356 mm) guns the Tennessees carried. The turbo-electric drive propulsion system that was developed for the Colorados was retroactively applied to Tennessee and California in December 1915, before construction had begun on either vessel.

=== General characteristics and machinery ===
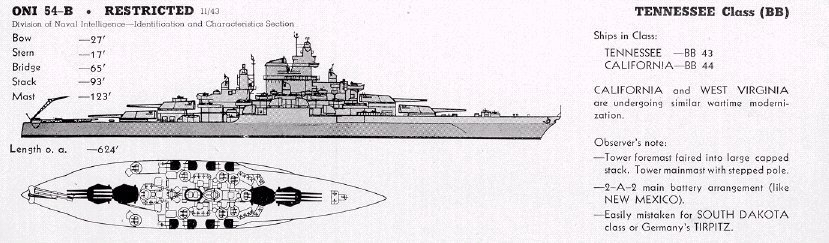
Recognition drawing of Tennessee in her 1943 configuration

The Tennessee-class ships were 600 feet (182.9 m) long at the waterline, 624 ft (190.2 m) long overall, had a beam of 97 ft 5 in (29.7 m), and a draft of 30 ft 2 in (9.2 m). They displaced 32,300 long tons (32,818 t) standard, and 33,190 long tons (33,723 t) at full combat load. Under emergency conditions, additional fuel and ammunition could be stored, which significantly increased displacement to 37,948 long tons (38,557 t), which accordingly deepened draft to 34 feet 9.875 inches (10.6 m). The ships' hulls featured a pronounced clipper bow to handle high seas and reduce spray. A double bottom extended for the full length of the ships, and their hulls featured extensive compartmentalization to reduce the risk of uncontrollable flooding; below the waterline, the hull had 768 compartments and another 180 above the line.

The main deck, the highest deck that extended for the entire length of the ship, contained much of the living space for their crews, which included 57 officers and 1,026 enlisted men. As built, they were fitted with two lattice masts with spotting tops for the main battery. Steering was controlled by a single balanced rudder.

The ships were powered by turbo-electric drive. Eight oil-fired Babcock & Wilcox water-tube boilers generated steam that powered two Westinghouse turbo-electric generators that in turn provided power for four electric motors that drove four 3-bladed, 14-foot (4.3 m) screws. The turbines were in separate watertight compartments, arranged fore and aft, with four boilers apiece; each boiler had its own watertight boiler rooms, with two boilers on either side of the turbines. The motors were arranged in three rooms: a larger, central room for the two engines driving the inboard shafts, and one for each outboard shaft on either side. Each set of four boilers was ducted into its own funnel.

Their propulsion systems were rated at 28,600 shaft horsepower (21,300 kW), generating a top speed of 21 knots (39 km/h; 24 mph). On speed trials, Tennessee reached a maximum of 21.38 knots (39.60 km/h; 24.60 mph) from 29,609 shp (22,079 kW). Normal oil storage amounted to 1,900 long tons (1,930 t), but voids in the hull could be used to increase maximum emergency fuel capacity to 4,656 long tons (4,731 t). They had a cruising range of 8,000 nautical miles (15,000 km; 9,200 mi) at a speed of 10 knots (19 km/h; 12 mph), which fell to 2,500 nautical miles (4,600 km; 2,900 mi) at 20 knots (37 km/h; 23 mph) normally; with full emergency oil their range more than doubled, to 20,500 nautical miles (38,000 km; 23,600 mi) at 10 knots and 9,700 nautical miles (18,000 km; 11,200 mi) at 18 knots (33 km/h; 21 mph).

=== Armament ===
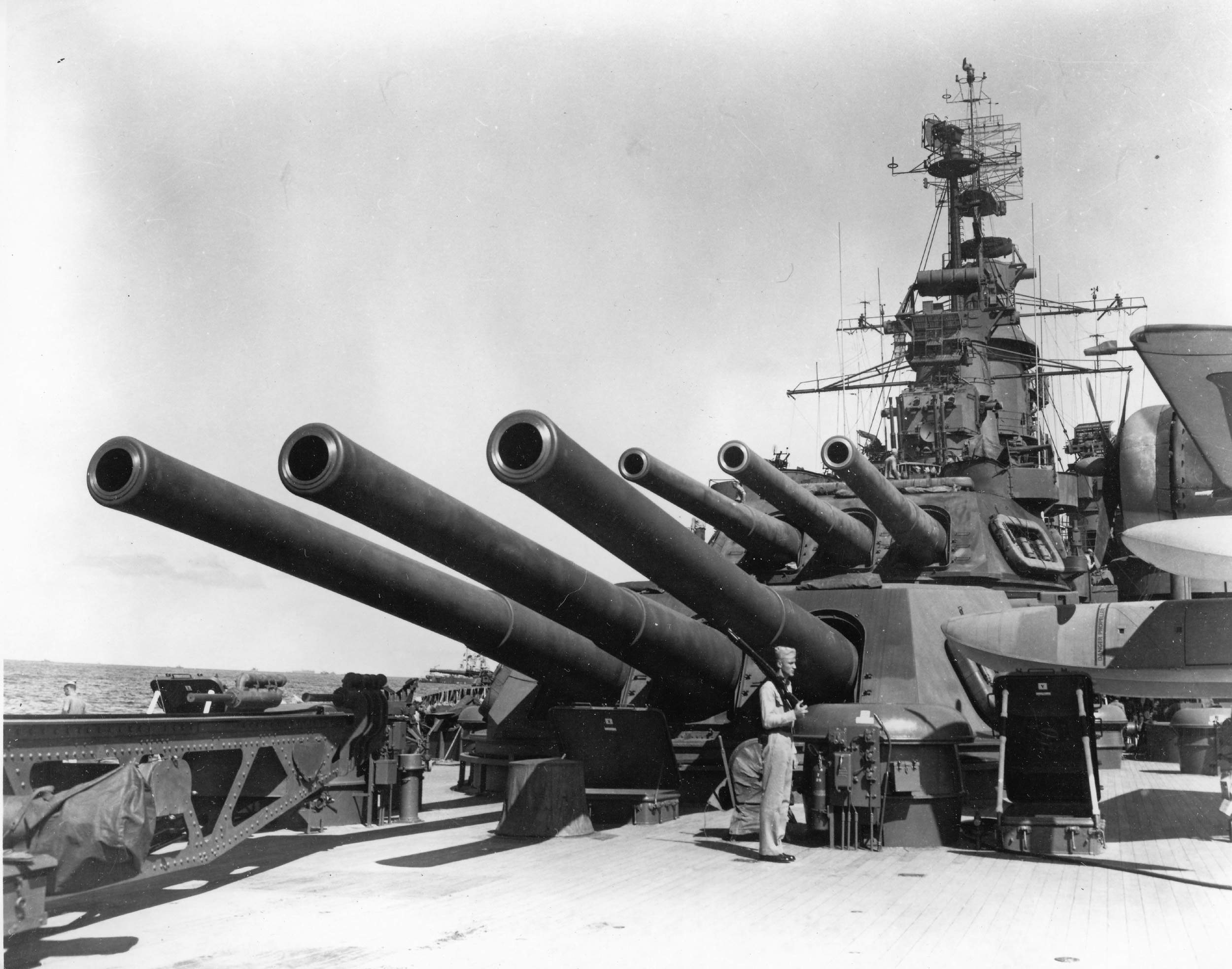
California's aft turrets

The ships were armed with a main battery of twelve 14-inch (356 mm) /50 caliber Mark IV guns (Note: A 50 caliber gun has a length 50 times its bore diameter.) in four three-gun turrets, placed on the centerline in superfiring pairs forward and aft of the superstructure. Unlike earlier American battleships with triple turrets, these mounts allowed each barrel to elevate independently. Since Tennessee and California were laid down after the Battle of Jutland of mid-year 1916, which demonstrated the value of very long-range plunging fire, their main battery turrets were modified while still under construction to allow elevation to 30 degrees. This provided a maximum range of 35,100 yards (32,100 m) with the standard 1,500-pound (680 kg) armor-piercing shell, which was fired with a muzzle velocity of 2,625 ft/s (800 m/s). With the lighter 1,275 lb (578 kg) high-capacity shell, the muzzle velocity increased to 2,825 ft/s (861 m/s) for a correspondingly greater range of 36,650 yd (33,510 m). The guns suffered from excessive dispersion of shot, which was eventually discovered to have been caused by overly lengthy chambers, which allowed a gap between the shell and the propellant charges. The problem was eventually corrected with the Mark VII gun.

The secondary battery consisted of fourteen 5-inch (127 mm) /51 caliber guns, ten of which were mounted in individual casemates clustered in the superstructure amidships at 01 deck level, one deck higher than the main deck. Six of the guns were arranged to fire forward and four were pointed aft. The remaining four guns were placed in open pivot mounts another deck higher at 02 level; two were placed abreast the conning tower and the others placed on either side of the funnels. Initially, the ships were to have been fitted with twenty-two of the guns, but experiences in the North Sea during World War I demonstrated that the additional guns, which would have been placed in the hull, would have been unusable in anything but calm seas. As a result, the casemates were plated over to prevent flooding. The guns were the Mark VIII type, which had a muzzle velocity of 3,150 ft/s (960 m/s) firing a 50 lb (23 kg) shell.

The battleships carried four 3-inch (76 mm)/50 caliber Mark X guns for anti-aircraft defense. These guns were located on the 02 deck, with two on either side of the boat cranes and the other two abreast of the mainmast. The guns fired a 13 lb (5.9 kg) shell at a velocity of 2,700 ft/s (820 m/s). They also carried a variety of other guns, including four 6-pounder saluting guns and a 3-inch Mark XI field gun and several machine guns for use by landing parties.

In addition to their gun armament, the Tennessee-class ships were also fitted with a pair of 21-inch (533 mm) torpedo tubes, with one mounted submerged in the hull on each broadside. They were supplied with Bliss-Leavitt torpedoes of the Mark VII type; these carried a 321 lb (146 kg) warhead and had a range of 12,500 yd (11,400 m) at a speed of 27 kn (50 km/h; 31 mph).

=== Armor ===
Their main armored belt was 8–13.5 in (203–343 mm) thick and was approximately 18 ft (5.5 m) wide, half of which was above the waterline. The thicker armor protected the ships' vitals, including the ammunition magazines and propulsion machinery spaces, extending from the forwardmost barbette to the aftmost barbette; the stern received lighter armor plating. Both ends of the main belt were capped by armored transverse bulkheads that were 13.5 in thick. The main armored deck was up to 3.5 in (89 mm) thick, and it was connected to the top of the main belt, running between the transverse armored bulkheads. A second armor deck that was 2.5 in (64 mm) thick was placed below the main deck; further aft, where it constituted the only horizontal protection, it increased in thickness to 5 in. On the ships' bows, the lower armor deck was increased to 3 in.

The main battery gun turrets had 18 in (457 mm) thick faces, 10 in (254 mm) thick sides, 9 in (229 mm) rears, and 5 in (127 mm) roofs; teak backing was used to cushion the structures from shell impacts. The turrets were mounted atop 13 in (330 mm) barbettes. Their conning towers had 16 in (406 mm) thick sides with 6 in (152 mm) thick roofs. The armored coamings for the funnel uptakes were 9 in thick.

=== Modifications ===
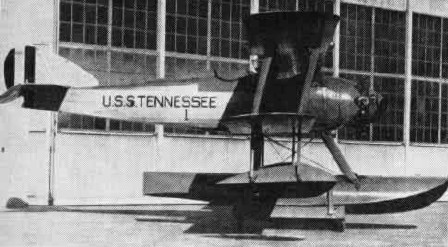
One of Tennessee's Vought UO-1s

The Tennessees underwent a series of minor modifications to their secondary and anti-aircraft armament through the 1920s and 1930s. In 1922, Tennessee had the two 5-inch guns abreast the mainmast removed and four more 3-inch guns installed, two of which were placed where the 5-inch guns had been. The other two were placed behind the forward 5-inch mounts. All eight guns were removed in 1928 and replaced with eight 5-inch /25 caliber anti-aircraft guns. California was similarly rearmed during a refit in 1929–1930. Eight .50 caliber machine guns were added, six to the roofs of the spotting tops, two on the foremast and four on the mainmast. The other two guns were placed on pedestals on either side of the foremast. Tennessee had two of the 3-inch guns returned in 1940, placed on either side of the bridge wings.

Other changes included the installation of aircraft-handling equipment. California had an aircraft catapult installed on her aft superfiring turret and she received three Vought UO-1 seaplanes for reconnaissance and fire direction. Two years later, Tennessee was similarly modified, though her catapult was located on the fantail. In the early 1930s, she received a second catapult on her aft turret, and at some point California also had a catapult fitted to her fantail. During their 1943 reconstruction, the turret-mounted catapults were removed and both ships were fitted with just a catapult on the fantail.

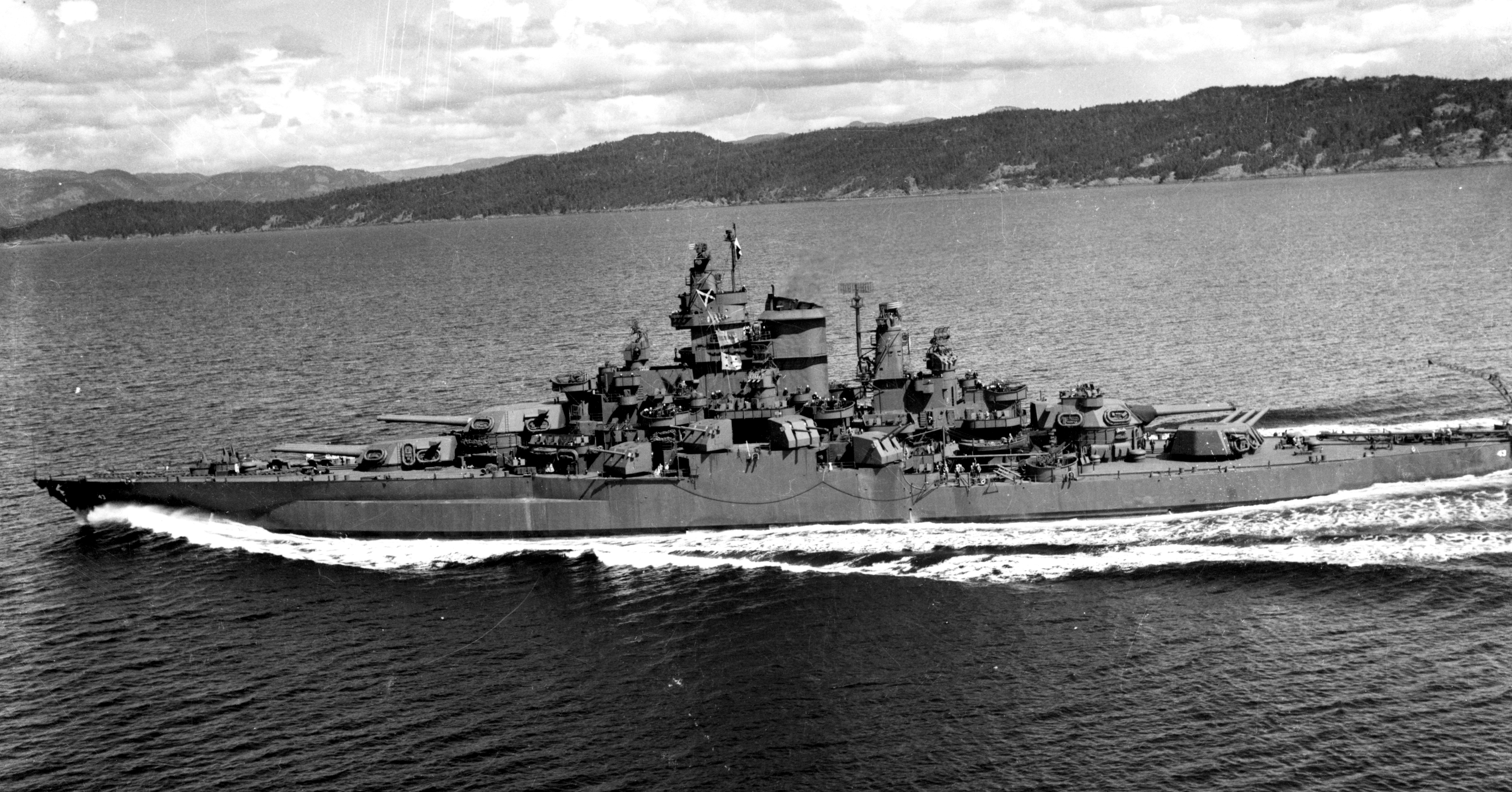
Tennessee after 1943 modernization

Both ships were extensively reconstructed and modernized after being damaged during the attack on Pearl Harbor in December 1941. New anti-torpedo bulges were installed and their internal compartmentalization was improved to strengthen their resistance to underwater damage. The ships' superstructures were completely revised, with the old heavily armored conning tower being removed and a smaller tower was erected in its place to reduce interference with the anti-aircraft guns' fields of fire. The new towers had been removed from one of the Brooklyn-class cruisers that had recently been rebuilt. The foremast was replaced with a tower mast that housed the bridge and the main battery director, and their second funnels were removed, with those boilers being trunked into an enlarged forward funnel. Horizontal protection was considerably strengthened to improve their resistance to air attack; 3 inches of special treatment steel (STS) was added to the deck over the magazines and 2 inches (51 mm) of STS was added elsewhere.

Their weapons suite was also overhauled. Both ships received air-search radar and fire-control radars for their main and secondary batteries, the latter seeing the mixed battery of 51-caliber and 25-caliber 5-inch guns replaced by a uniform battery of sixteen 5-inch/38 caliber guns in eight twin mounts. These were controlled by four Mk 37 directors. The light anti-aircraft battery was again revised, now consisting of ten quadruple 40 mm (1.6 in) Bofors guns and forty-three 20 mm Oerlikons, all in single mounts. The changes doubled the ships' crew, to a total of 114 officers and 2,129 enlisted men. During her final refit in January 1945, Tennessee received an SP air search radar and a Mark 27 fire control radar. By August 1945, California had her light anti-aircraft battery upgraded to fourteen quadruple 40 mm (1.6 in) Bofors guns and eighty 20 mm Oerlikons in twin mounts.

== Ships in class ==
Construction data
Ship name	Hull no.	Builder	Laid Down	Launched	Commissioned	Decommissioned	Fate
Tennessee	BB-43	New York Naval Shipyard	14 May 1917	30 April 1919	3 June 1920	14 February 1947	Struck 1 March 1959; Sold for scrap 10 July 1959
California	BB-44	Mare Island Naval Shipyard	25 October 1916	20 November 1919	10 August 1921	14 February 1947	Struck 1 March 1959; Sold for scrap 10 July 1959

== Service history ==
=== Prewar careers and Pearl Harbor ===
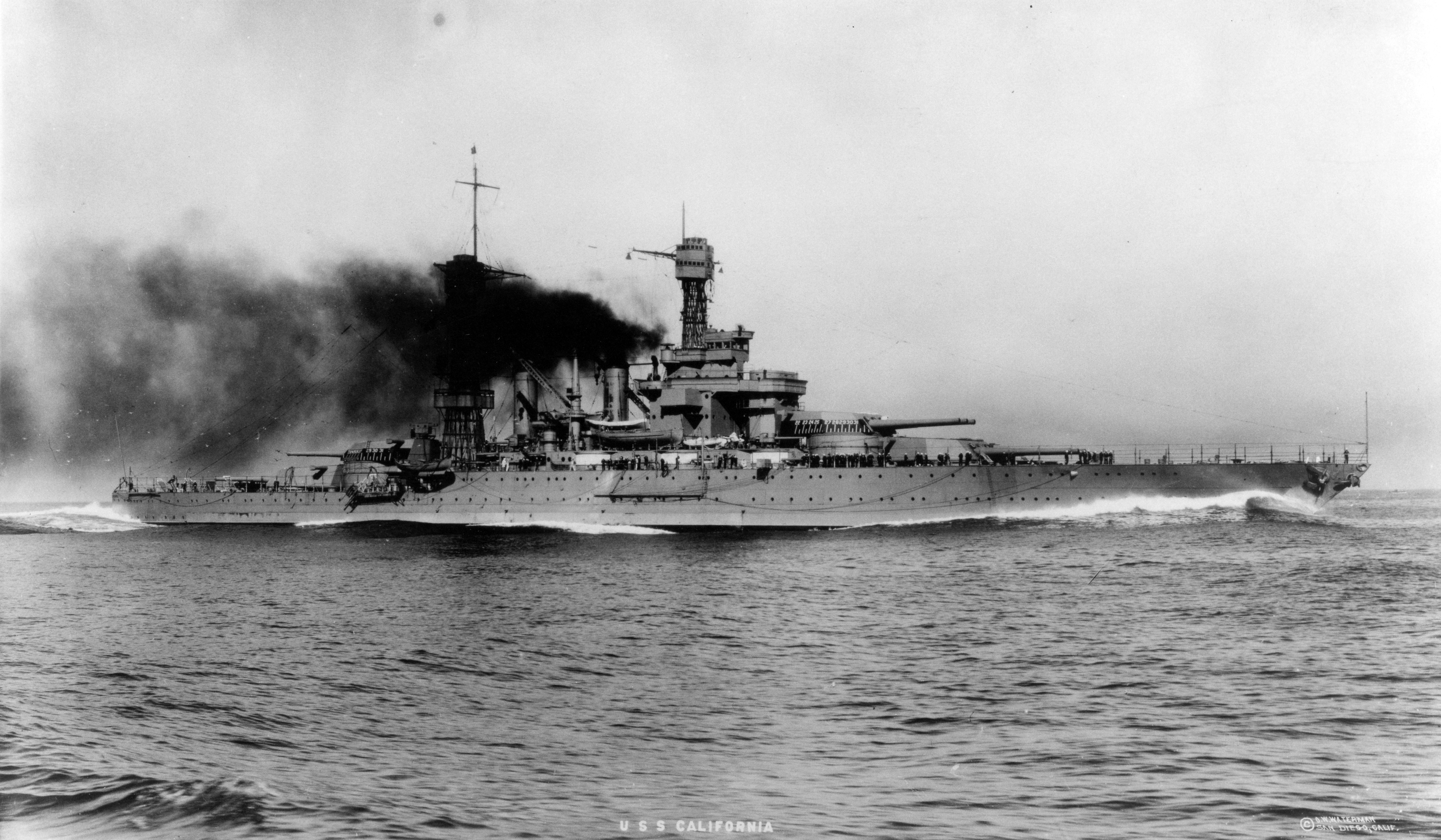
California steaming at high speed, 1921

Tennessee and California served in the Pacific Fleet, later renamed the Battle Fleet in 1922 and then the Battle Force in 1931, in the Pacific Ocean for duration of their peacetime careers, with California serving as the fleet flagship. She spent the 1920s and 1930s participating in routine fleet training exercises, including the annual Fleet Problems, and cruises around the Americas and further abroad, such as a goodwill visit to Australia and New Zealand in 1925. The fleet problems conducted in the 1920s and 1930s provided the basis for the US Navy's operations in the Pacific War, and experience that demonstrated that the standard type battleships were too slow to operate with aircraft carriers led to the development of the fast battleships built in the 1930s. Joint training with the Marine Corps provided experience that proved to be useful during the island hopping campaign during the Pacific War. In November 1924, Lieutenant Dixie Kiefer took off from California, the first night aircraft launch in history. While in Long Beach, California, the ships sent crewmen ashore to assist with relief after the 1933 Long Beach earthquake.

During a period of rising tensions with Japan over the Second Sino-Japanese War in 1940, President Franklin D. Roosevelt ordered the Battle Force to relocate from its homeport in San Pedro, California, to Pearl Harbor in Hawaii in an effort to deter further aggression. Modernization work for the ships that was scheduled for 1940 and 1941 was cancelled, as was the fleet problem for 1941, as the situation with Japan was approaching a crisis and the Navy determined that the fleet needed to be maintained at a high state of readiness. Nevertheless, when the Japanese attacked the fleet at Pearl Harbor on 7 December 1941, they did so having achieved complete surprise. Totally unprepared for the surprise attack, both ships were anchored in Battleship Row, where California was sunk in shallow water. Tennessee, moored inboard of the battleship West Virginia and thus protected from torpedo attacks, emerged relatively undamaged, though fires from other ships had warped some of her hull plates and necessitated repairs. She was also trapped when West Virginia sank and came to rest up against Tennessee, forcing her up against the concrete quay.

=== World War II ===
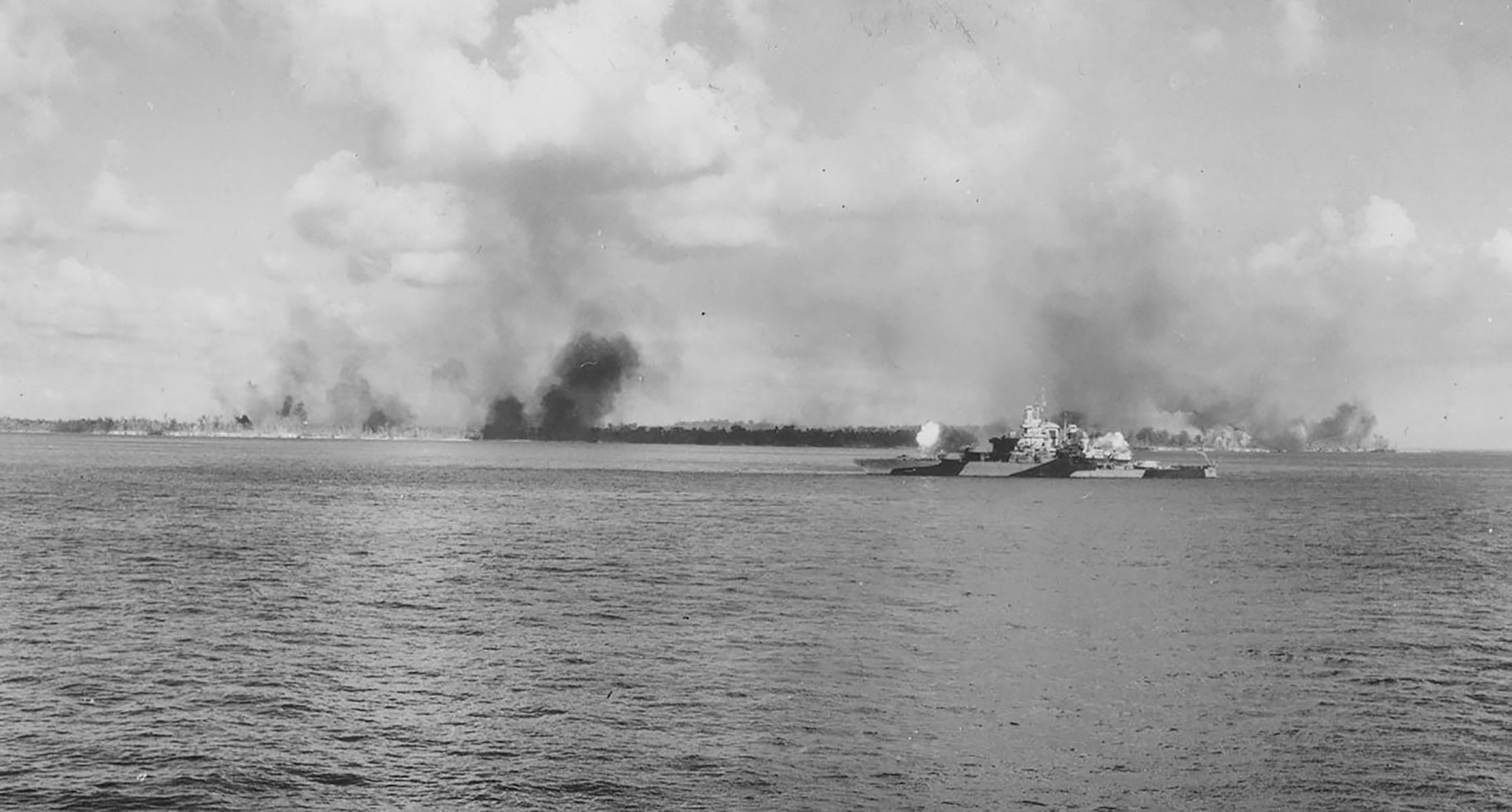
Tennessee bombarding Angaur during the Battle of Peleliu in 1944

After being freed from Battleship Row, Tennessee steamed to the Puget Sound Navy Yard, where the initial modernization program began. California was raised from the harbor bottom in mid-1942 and taken to Puget Sound as well, where she was rebuilt, beginning in October. By that time, Tennessee had returned to service with her upgraded light anti-aircraft battery, but she saw no active operations owing to the crippling fuel shortage in the Pacific at the time. The Navy decided that she should be rebuilt along the same lines as California, so she returned to Puget Sound to be reconstructed. Tennessee was completed first, returning to the fleet in May 1943 in time to participate in the Aleutian Islands campaign, thus beginning her career as a naval gunfire support vessel during the island-hopping campaign against Japan. In this role, she conducted preparatory bombardments to destroy Japanese defensive positions and provided support to marine and Army ground forces as they fought their way ashore, suppressing Japanese defenders and targeting defensive strongpoints.

Tennessee thereafter deployed to the central Pacific to take part in the Gilbert and Marshall Islands campaign, beginning with the Battle of Tarawa in November. The Battles of Kwajalein and Eniwetok followed in early 1944, by which time work on California had been completed. While California was still conducting sea trials, Tennessee next took part in the final stages of Operation Cartwheel by bombarding Kavieng as a diversionary attack. California was ready for service in time for the Mariana and Palau Islands campaign in mid-1944, and both ships shelled Japanese positions on Saipan, Tinian, and Guam. The two ships collided while en route to the last target in the campaign, Peleliu, which prevented California from participating in the Battle of Peleliu, though Tennessee remained in action. During the fighting on Tinian, Tennessee was hit by Japanese field artillery and slightly damaged.

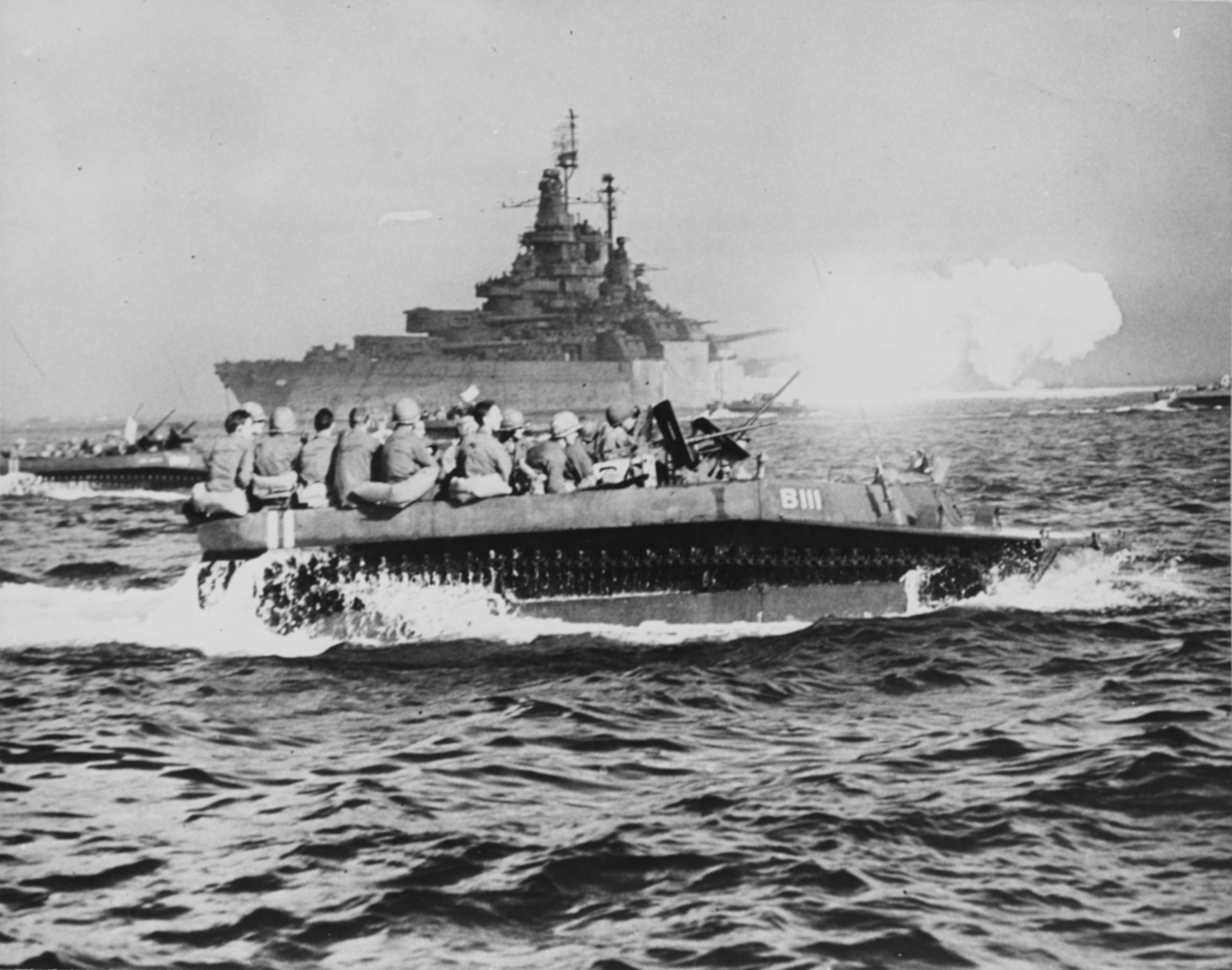
Tennessee bombarding Okinawa with her main battery guns, as LVTs in the foreground carry troops to the invasion beaches

Both ships had been repaired in time to participate in the next major offensive, the Philippines campaign that began with the invasion of Leyte in October 1944. Both vessels supported the landing, which triggered the Japanese to launch Operation Shō-Gō 1, a major naval counterattack that resulted in the Battle of Leyte Gulf on 23–26 October. California and Tennessee, as part of the bombardment group under Rear Admiral Jesse B. Oldendorf, took part in one component of the complex battle, the action of Surigao Strait, on the night of 24/25 October. There, the Allied fleet destroyed the Japanese Southern Force consisting of a pair of old battleships, one heavy cruiser, and four destroyers; only one Japanese destroyer escaped the overwhelming Allied fleet. California and Tennessee fired only briefly during the engagement, as a miscommunication between their commanders almost led to another collision, which threw them out of firing position. They were nevertheless present for the last battleship engagement in history.

California continued operations off the Philippines, though Tennessee was recalled for a refit at Puget Sound. During the Battle of Lingayen Gulf in January 1945, California was hit by a kamikaze suicide plane, though she shot down a second attacker. She was not seriously damaged, but her crew suffered heavy casualties, with over 50 killed and more than 150 wounded. She returned to Puget Sound for repairs, by which time work on Tennessee was completed, allowing her to return to combat off Iwo Jima in early February. She provided heavy fire support, targeting Mount Suribachi before and during the Battle of Iwo Jima, before proceeding to Okinawa to conduct the preparatory bombardment of this island for the coming invasion. She operated off the island for the next month; during the Battle of Okinawa, where the Japanese made repeated and heavy kamikaze attacks on the Allied fleet, Tennessee was hit by one suicide aircraft on 12 April that did little damage but killed more than twenty and wounded more than a hundred. She was detached to Ulithi for repairs that were completed by early June, when she returned to the fighting off Okinawa. Tennessee was joined shortly thereafter by California, though by then the fighting ashore was in its final stages.

The two ships were then assigned to Task Force 95, which was charged with patrolling the East China Sea, with Tennessee as the flagship of its commander, Vice Admiral Oldendorf. They supported the initial occupation of Japan in September before being sent home to the United States later that month. Now too wide to fit through the Panama Canal as a result of their 1943 reconstructions, they were forced to return to the east coast of the United States by way of the Indian and Atlantic Oceans. There, they were decommissioned and assigned to the Atlantic Reserve Fleet, based in Philadelphia. Both battleships were stricken from the Naval Vessel Register in March 1959, sold for scrap on 10 July, and thereafter broken up.
