= SS Republic (1853) =

Sidewheel steamship

Coordinates: 30.9566°N 79.6769°W

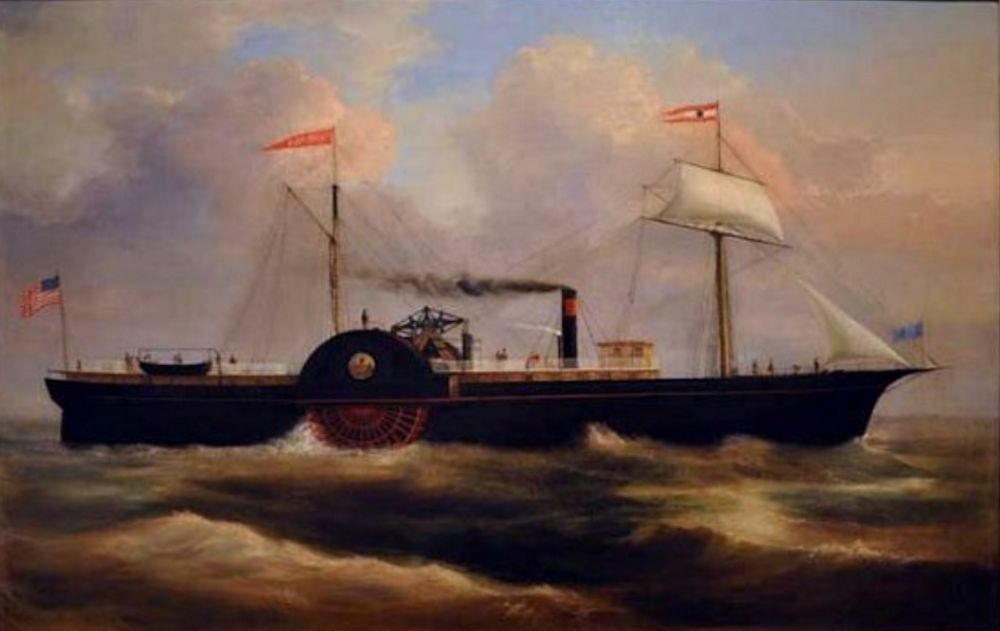

History

United States
- Name: SS Tennessee
- Builder: John A. Robb
- Launched: 1853
- Captured: Captured in by Confederate States of America

History

Confederate States
- Name: CSS Tennessee
- Captured: Recaptured by the United States in April 1862

History

United States
- Name: USS Tennessee (1862-1864) USS Mobile (1864-1865)
- Fate: Returned to civilian service in March 1865

History

United States
- Name: SS Republic
- Fate: Sank in a hurricane, October 25, 1865 approx. 100 miles (160 km) southeast of Savannah, Georgia

General characteristics
- Displacement: 1,149 tons
- Tons burthen: 1275-ton
- Length: 210 ft (64 m)
- Beam: 33 ft 11 in (10.34 m)
- Installed power: Single piston steam engine
- Propulsion: Two 28-foot steel paddlewheels
- Capacity: 100 passengers
- Notes: 5,000 barrels of cargo

SS Republic was a sidewheel steamship, originally named SS Tennessee (also named CSS Tennessee, USS Tennessee, and USS Mobile for a time), lost in a hurricane off the coast of Georgia in October 1865, en route to New Orleans.

In 2003, the wreck was located 100 mi (160 km) off the coast of Savannah, Georgia, and artifacts are on display in selected museums, along with video stories about passengers and crew members.

== History ==
=== Early years ===
The ship was built in Baltimore, Maryland, by shipbuilder John A. Robb, for the famed War of 1812 veteran, James Hooper, president of the Baltimore and Southern Steam Packet Company, and launched in 1853, as the Tennessee. She began her service as a merchant vessel plying the Baltimore–Charleston route. Not long afterward, she was sent on the first trans-Atlantic crossing by a Baltimore steamship, sailing to Southampton, England, and Le Havre, France. A short time later Tennessee was used to open the first regular passenger steamship service between New York City and Central America.

During the California Gold Rush, the Tennessee transported "49'ers" to the eastern shores of Panama and Nicaragua to travel to California's Sierra Nevada mountains. The Tennessee delivered the last group of "immigrants" volunteering as mercenary soldiers for William Walker in Nicaragua, and, after defeat of Walker's forces, took home hundreds of disconsolate, defeated survivors.

Tennessee for several years regularly served the Vera Cruz, Mexico–New Orleans route, often transporting immigrants to America as well as large sums of Mexican gold and silver. She was tied up in harbor at New Orleans when the American Civil War began on April 12, 1861.

=== Civil War service ===
At the outbreak of the Civil War, she was trapped in port at New Orleans, Louisiana, and was seized for use as a Confederate blockade runner as the CSS Tennessee in 1861, although she was never able to escape blockade of the New Orleans harbor. After the Union capture of New Orleans, the ship was put into armed Union service, including as the flagship of United States Navy Admiral David G. Farragut for the conclusion of the Mississippi Campaign. As USS Tennessee, she was not only a fast and effective blockade ship in the West Gulf Squadron, but also a powerful gunship used to bombard Ft. Morgan during the Battle of Mobile Bay.

In September 1864, she was renamed USS Mobile to allow a famous Confederate armored ram ship to carry the name Tennessee after its capture. This second CSS Tennessee had been taken during a dramatic encounter at Mobile Bay. USS Mobile was damaged in a hurricane off the mouth of the Rio Grande in October 1864, and sent to New York for repair. Upon inspection, the ship was judged too expensive to refit and was taken out of U.S. Navy commission in December, 1864. She was sold at auction in March, 1865, renamed SS Republic, repaired, and soon returned to the New York–New Orleans route hauling passengers and cargo. She was lost on her fifth civilian voyage after the war.

=== Wreck ===
The Republic left New York on October 18, 1865, bound for New Orleans. According to her captain, she was carrying passengers and a cargo of $400,000 in coins, mostly in gold $10 and $20 pieces, intended for use as hard currency after the Civil War. The city of New Orleans, captured largely intact by the Union in 1862, had been the southern hub of Federal war efforts and was a thriving, busy city – but due to war, "hard money" (or gold and silver coin) was in very short supply.

On the fifth day of her voyage, a hurricane off the coast of Georgia proved too strong for the ship. By evening, her hull was leaking so badly that the fire in the boiler was extinguished, and she stalled in heavy seas, taking on water faster than her crew and passengers could bail her. At 4 pm on October 25, 1865, she sank. The passengers and crew escaped in four lifeboats and a makeshift raft, but 40-foot seas throughout the night made keeping them afloat a serious challenge. It was not until two days later, on October 27 that the survivors, now desperate with thirst, were found by the sailing ship Horace Beals. On October 29, the steamer General Hooker had been sent to look for the Republic, and rendezvoused with Horace Beals. The passengers were transferred and taken to Charleston. Most of the passengers and crew survived, although several were lost on the raft before they could be rescued. All the coins were lost.

=== Rediscovery ===
In August 2003, the wreck of the Republic was located by Odyssey Marine Exploration, Inc., a commercial archaeology company in Tampa, Florida. She was found about 100 miles (160 km) southeast of Savannah, Georgia, in about 1,700 feet (520 meters) of water. A salvage effort recovered about one-third of the rare 19th-century gold and silver coins carried aboard, worth an estimated $75 million. Most of the hull of the ship is now gone, but the rudder, parts of the paddle wheel and the steam engine are still present. The search and recovery effort was depicted in a National Geographic Society TV documentary Civil War Gold.

Many artifacts, from the 14,000 salvaged, plus silver coins from the 51,000 coins collected, are on display in selected museums. Artifacts have been on display in Tampa, New Orleans, Detroit, Elberta, Hot Springs, and Oklahoma City. The displays also present video stories about passengers and crew members, and where they moved years after the wreck. Lifeboats had been found and rescued at different times.

SS Republic is currently the subject of a lawsuit over the gold recovery, as E. Lee Spence claims in a lawsuit that Odyssey Marine used his information in their efforts to locate the wreck. A judge in South Carolina has ruled that the case may proceed in that state, reversing his own earlier decision.

== See also ==
- Nuestra Señora de Atocha
- El Cazador
- RMS Republic
- SS Central America
