= Treaty battleship =

Ship built under international treaty

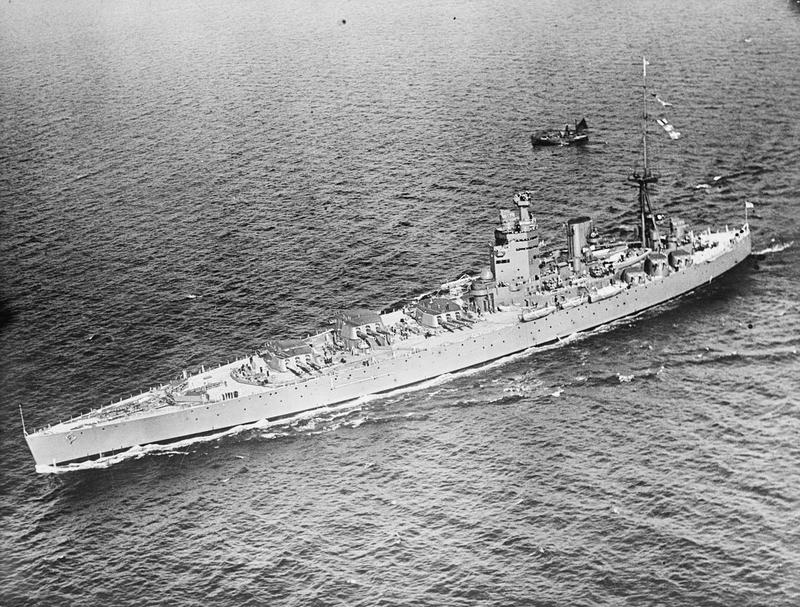
HMS Nelson was the first treaty battleship

A treaty battleship was a battleship built in the 1920s or 1930s under the terms of one of a number of international treaties governing warship construction. Many of these ships played an active role in the Second World War, but few survived long after it.

The first of the treaties was the Washington Naval Treaty signed in 1922. The world's five naval powers agreed to abide by strict restrictions on the construction of battleships and battlecruisers, in order to prevent an arms race in naval construction such as preceded World War I. The Treaty limited the number of capital ships possessed by each signatory, and also the total tonnage of each navy's battleships. New ships could only be constructed to replace the surviving ships as they retired after 20 years' service. Furthermore, any new ship would be limited to guns of 16-inch caliber and a displacement of 35,000 tons.

The Washington Treaty limits were extended and modified by the London Naval Treaty of 1930 and the Second London Naval Treaty of 1936. During the 1930s, however, the effectiveness of these agreements broke down, as some signatory powers (in particular Japan) withdrew from the treaty arrangements and others only paid lip service to them. By 1938, Britain and the USA had both invoked an 'escalator clause' in the Second London Treaty which allowed battleships of up to 45,000 tons displacement, and the Treaty was effectively defunct.

The strict limits on displacement forced the designers of battleships to make compromises which they might have wished to avoid given the choice. The 1920s and 1930s saw a number of innovations in battleship design, particularly in engines, underwater protection, and aircraft.

== Background ==
After World War I ended in 1918, a large number of treaties aiming to ensure peace were signed. According to historian Larry Addington it was "the greatest effort to that time to control armaments and to discourage war through treaty". These treaties ranged from the Treaty of Versailles, which contained provisions were intended to make the Reichswehr incapable of offensive action and to encourage international disarmament, to the Kellogg–Briand Pact of 1928, in which signatory states promised not to use war to resolve "disputes or conflicts of whatever nature or of whatever origin they may be, which may arise among them". Specific naval treaties that emerged during this era include the Washington Naval Treaty in 1921 and the London Naval Treaty in 1930.

In the latter half of and after World War I, the United States embarked on a large battleship construction program, with the passage of the Naval Act of 1916 allowing for the construction of ten battleships. The Naval Appropriations Act of 1917 authorized the construction of a further three battleships, to the point that it was projected the United States would be comparable to the Royal Navy in strength by 1923 or 1924. In response, the British Navy began campaigning for a ship building program, proposing building the G3 battlecruisers. Such proposals were unpopular and viewed as unnecessarily expensive. The Japanese government was also embarking on a large program of warship building. Britain was eager to engage in naval limitation talks, fearing the danger America's aggressive ship building posed to their empire. All three countries were open to negotiations as a result of the massive cost of building and maintaining a large navy.

== Treaties ==
In December 1919, former British Foreign Secretary Lord Grey of Fallodon and Secretary of State for Foreign Affairs Lord Robert Cecil met Edward M. House, the adviser of Woodrow Wilson, in Washington, D.C. At the meeting, the United States temporarily agreed to slow battleship building in exchange for the British withdrawing their opposition to inclusion of the Monroe Doctrine in the League of Nations Covenant.

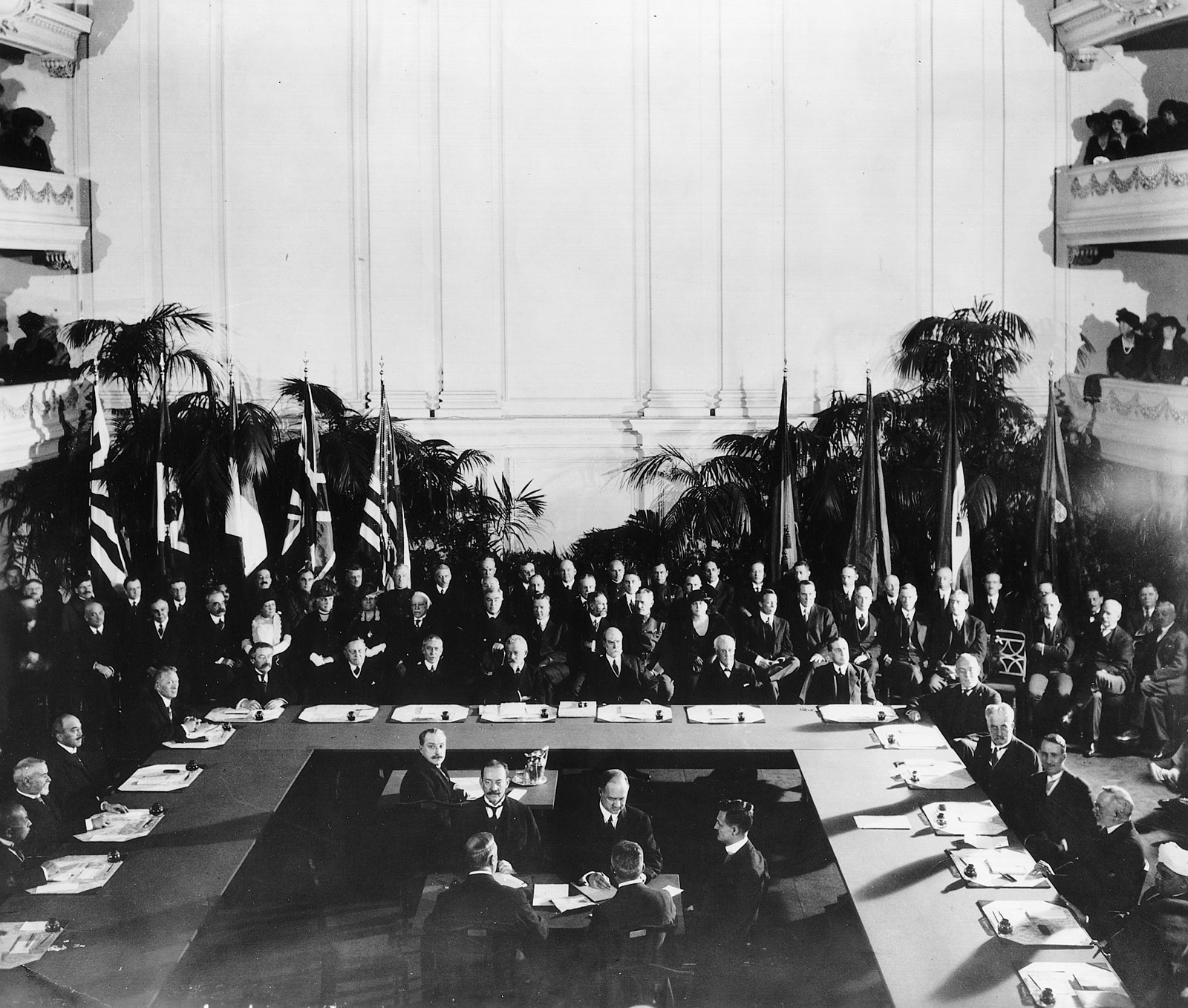
Signing of the Washington Naval Treaty

=== Washington Naval Treaty ===
From 12 November 1921 to 6 February 1922, the Washington Naval Conference was held to stop a naval arms race from emerging. Nine nations attended at the request of Secretary of State Charles Evans Hughes; the United States, Japan, China, France, Britain, Italy, Belgium, Netherlands and Portugal. The conference led to the Nine-Power Treaty, which reaffirmed support for the Open Door Policy towards China; the Four-Power Treaty in which the United States, United Kingdom, France and Japan agreed to maintain the status quo in the Pacific, by respecting the Pacific territories of the other countries signing the agreement, not seeking further territorial expansion, and mutual consultation with each other in the event of a dispute over territorial possessions.

The most important treaty signed during the conference was the Washington Naval Treaty, or Five-Power Treaty, between the United States, Britain, Japan, France, and Italy. The treaty strictly limited both the tonnage and construction of capital ships and aircraft carriers and included limits of the size of individual ships. The tonnage limits defined by Articles IV and VII limited the United States and Great Britain to 525,000 tons in their capital fleets, Japan to 315,000 tons and France and Italy to 175,000 tons. It instituted a 10-year "battleship building holiday". No agreements were reached on cruiser tonnage amounts and submarines. The treaty limited capital ships (battleships and battlecruisers, defined as any warship with guns more than 8-inch in caliber and 10,000 tons standard displacement) to 35,000 tons standard displacement and guns of no larger than 16-inch calibre.

Chapter II, Part 2, detailed what was to be done to render a ship ineffective for military use. In addition to sinking or scrapping, a limited number of ships could be converted as target ships or training vessels if their armament, armour and other combat-essential parts were removed completely. Part 3, Section II specified the ships to be scrapped to comply with the treaty and when the remaining ships could be replaced. In all, the United States had to scrap 26 existing or planned capital ships, Britain 24 and Japan 16.

=== Geneva Naval Conferences ===
The First Geneva Naval Conference was a meeting of the United States, Great Britain and Japan (France and Italy declined to engage in further negotiations) called together by Calvin Coolidge in 1927. The aim of the Conference was to extend the existing limits on naval construction which had been agreed in the Washington Naval Treaty. The Washington Treaty had limited the construction of battleships and aircraft carriers, but had not limited the construction of cruisers, destroyers or submarines. The British proposed limiting battleships to be under 30,000 tons, with 15-inch guns. The Conference ended with no agreement reached. The Second Geneva Naval Conference in 1932 similarly ended without an agreement, after nations deadlocked over rearmament of Germany.

=== London Treaties ===
The limits set in the Washington Naval Treaty were reiterated by the London Naval Treaty signed in 1930. A limit of 57,000 tons for submarines was decided upon, and the battleship building holiday was extended for a further ten years. Signed in 1936, the Second London Naval Treaty further limited guns to 14-inch calibre. The Second London Treaty contained a clause which allowed construction of battleships with 16-inch guns if any of the signatories of the Washington Treaty failed to ratify the new one. It contained an additional clause which allowed displacement restrictions to be relaxed if non-signatories built vessels more powerful than the treaty allowed.

== Battleships ==
The Washington and London Naval treaty limitations meant that fewer new battleships were launched in 1919–1939 than in 1905–1914 due to an imposed battleship construction holiday, which ended in 1933. They also inhibited development by imposing upper limits on the weights of ships. Designs like the projected British N3-class battleship, the first American South Dakota class, and the Japanese Kii class—all of which continued the trend to larger ships with bigger guns and thicker armor—never finished construction.

The Japanese battleship Mutsu was laid down on 1 June 1918. It was one of the largest battleships in the world at the time, and at the Washington Naval Conference, the United Kingdom and United States urged the abandonment of the project. However, it was allowed under the condition that the US and UK got two additional 16-inch gun ships. In 1920, Japan began building the Amagi and Akagi. The next year, the Kaga and Tosa were launched with around a 39,900-ton displacement. Upon the signing of the Washington Naval Treaty, Amagi and Tosa were abandoned and Kaga and Akagi were converted to 30,000-ton aircraft carriers. While a party to the treaty, Japan completely halted construction of battleships, instead focusing on battlecruisers. They embarked on an extensive cruiser building program, and began aggressively modernizing naval equipment. After leaving the treaty in 1936, they planned to construct the Yamato class, which would be the largest battleships in the world. Two were completed during World War II and a third was converted to an aircraft carrier.

The United States was allowed to keep three Colorado-class battleships that had been funded in the Naval Act of 1916 and a total of 500,360 tons of capital ships in the Washington Naval Treaty. Reduced naval spending by the Republican Party led to the navy remaining well below the maximum size specified in the treaty. Construction on several others was stopped, and the hull of the abandoned USS Washington was used for testing resistance to bombs, torpedoes and gunfire. Technical development and research towards battleships was severely restricted. The USS Lexington and Saratoga were originally designed as battlecruisers with 33,000 ton displacement, but were converted into aircraft carriers while under construction following passage of the treaty. The United States decommissioned a total of sixteen existing battleships, and stopped construction on the six ships of the first South Dakota class. The United States modernized their fleet but did not build up to treaty limits. The battleship holiday was extremely popular among the general public. The ships of the Nevada class had their gun elevations increased although the British argued it was a violation of the terms of the Washington Naval Treaty.

The Royal Navy scrapped or stopped construction on sixteen ships as a result of the Washington Naval Treaty. HMS Hood (40,000 tons displacement) was exempted from the restrictions set by the treaty. After the signing of the treaty, as a result of compromise with Japan, two Nelson-class treaty battleships were built, HMS Nelson and Rodney, the only two built by the Royal Navy until 1936. Their navy, while it remained the largest in the world until 1933, became increasingly out of date. Though the Royal Navy had the most battleships active at the outbreak of World War II, all but two dated back to World War I or earlier. As a result of the battleship building holiday, the Armstrong and Beardmore shipyards were forced to close.

France and Italy did not embark on large naval expansion programs, though the French battleship Béarn was converted to an aircraft carrier.

=== List of treaty battleships ===
Ship	Country	Class	Displacement (Long tons)	Main Gun	First commissioned	Fate	End of service
North Carolina	United States Navy	North Carolina	35,000	16"/45 calibre Mark 6	9 April 1941	Decommissioned 27 June 1947; museum ship	
Washington	United States Navy	North Carolina	35,000	16"/45 calibre Mark 6	15 May 1941	Decommissioned 27 June 1947, scrapped 1960	27 June 1947
Alabama	United States Navy	South Dakota	35,000	16"/45 calibre Mark 6	16 August 1942	Decommissioned 9 January 1947; museum ship	9 January 1947
Indiana	United States Navy	South Dakota	35,000	16"/45 calibre Mark 6	30 April 1942	Decommissioned 11 September 1947, scrapped 1963	15 November 1945
Massachusetts	United States Navy	South Dakota	37,970	16"/45 calibre Mark 6	12 May 1942	Decommissioned 27 March 1947; museum ship	
South Dakota	United States Navy	South Dakota	35,000	16"/45 calibre Mark 6	20 March 1942	Decommissioned 31 January 1947, scrapped 1962	31 January 1947
Nelson	Royal Navy	Nelson	34,000	BL 16-inch Mk I	10 September 1927	Decommissioned February 1948, scrapped March 1949	
Rodney	Royal Navy	Nelson	34,000	BL 16-inch Mk I	10 November 1927	Scrapped 1948	
Anson	Royal Navy	King George V	39,000	BL 14-inch Mk VII	22 June 1942	Scrapped 1957	1 November 1951
Duke of York	Royal Navy	King George V	39,000	BL 14-inch Mk VII	28 February 1940	Scrapped 1957	1 November 1951
Howe	Royal Navy	King George V	39,150	BL 14-inch Mk VII	28 September 1942	Scrapped 1958	1 January 1951
King George V	Royal Navy	King George V	39,100	BL 14-inch Mk VII	11 December 1940	Scrapped 1957	1 June 1950
Prince of Wales	Royal Navy	King George V	39,000	BL 14-inch Mk VII	31 March 1941	Sunk 10 December 1941	10 December 1941
Dunkerque	French Navy	Dunkerque	26,500	330 mm (13 in)/50 Modèle 1931	15 April 1937	Scuttled 27 November 1942	1 March 1942
Strasbourg	French Navy	Dunkerque	27,700	330 mm (13 in)/50 Modèle 1931	15 March 1938	Scuttled 27 November 1942	27 November 1942
Richelieu	French Navy Free French Naval Forces	Richelieu	35,000	380 mm (15 in)/45 Modèle 1935	15 July 1940	Scrapped 1968	
Jean Bart	French Navy	Richelieu	48,950	380 mm (15 in)/45 Modèle 1935	16 January 1949	Launched during war 6 March 1940, scrapped 24 June 1970	1 August 1957
Littorio	Regia Marina	Littorio	41,377	381(15 in)/50 Ansaldo M1934	6 May 1940	Renamed Italia, scrapped 1948	
Roma	Regia Marina	Littorio	41,649	381(15 in)/50 Ansaldo M1934	14 June 1942	Sunk 9 September 1943	9 September 1943
Vittorio Veneto	Regia Marina	Littorio	41,337	381 (15 in)/50 Ansaldo M1934	28 April 1940	Scrapped 1948	10 September 1943
Gneisenau	Kriegsmarine	Scharnhorst	32,000	28 cm (11 in) SK C/34	21 May 1938	Sunk as block ship March 1945	1 July 1942
Scharnhorst	Kriegsmarine	Scharnhorst	32,000	28 cm (11 in) SK C/34	7 January 1939	Sunk 26 December 1943	26 December 1943

==== Completed between the end of World War I and the signing of the Washington Naval Treaty ====
Ship	Country	Class	Displacement (Long tons)	Main Gun	First commissioned	Fate	End of service
Nagato	Imperial Japanese Navy	Nagato	39,130	41 cm (16 in)/45 3rd Year Type	25 November 1920	Sunk as target 29 July 1946	
Mutsu	Imperial Japanese Navy	Nagato	39,050	41 cm (16 in)/45 3rd Year Type	24 October 1921	Sunk in harbor by internal explosion 8 June 1943	8 June 1943
Colorado	United States Navy	Colorado	31,500	16"/45 caliber Mark 1	30 August 1923	Sold for scrap, 23 July 1959	23 July 1959
Maryland	United States Navy	Colorado	32,600	16"/45 caliber Mark 1	21 July 1921	Decommissioned 1947, scrapped 1959	
West Virginia	United States Navy	Colorado	31,500	16"/45 caliber Mark 1	1 December 1923	Decommissioned 9 January 1947, scrapped 1959	9 January 1947
Hood	Royal Navy	Admiral	42,100	BL 15-inch Mk I	5 March 1920	Sunk 24 May 1941	

== Aftermath ==
The Washington Naval Treaty was signed by the US, UK, Japan, France and Italy—all the principal naval powers. At various stages Italy and France opted out of further negotiations; however, their economic resources did not permit the development of super-battleships. Germany, while not permitted any battleships by the Treaty of Versailles, developed one in the 1930s; this was legitimised by the Anglo-German Naval Agreement, which placed Germany under the same legal limits as Britain.

Japan's policies were largely decided by militarists through the 1930s. Partially influenced by the passage of the Vinson-Trammell Act in 1934, and the National Industrial Recovery Act of 1933, in 1934 Japan announced they planned to leave the treaty system in two years. At the Second London conference, Japan showed willingness to negotiate, but left the conference in January 1936 and other treaties expired on 31 December 1936. They built mammoth treaty-busting battleships–the Yamato class.

As a result of the treaties, by the time rearmament began in the 1930s, before the onset of World War II, the world's battleships were largely aging and obsolete due to the rise of air power and increasing use of submarines. As a result, dreadnought technology had dramatically improved, and the building of new and upgrading old battleships began in earnest.

== Bibliography ==
Books and journals

- Addington, Larry H. (1994). The Patterns of War Since the Eighteenth Century. Indiana University Press. ISBN 978-0253301321.
- Breyer, Siegfried (1973). Battleships and Battlecruisers of the World, 1905–1970. Macdonald and Jane's. ISBN 978-0-356-04191-9.
- Brown, D. K. (2012). Nelson to Vanguard: Warship Design and Development 1923–1945. Seaforth Publishing. ISBN 978-1473816695.
- Fanning, Richard (2015). Peace And Disarmament: Naval Rivalry and Arms Control, 1922–1933. The University Press of Kentucky. ISBN 978-0813156767.
- Friedman, Norman (2015). The British Battleship: 1906–1946. Naval Institute Press. ISBN 978-1591142546.
- Fitzpatrick, David (2004). Harry Boland's Irish Revolution. Cork University Press. ISBN 978-1859183861.
- Goldstein, Donald M. (2005). The Pacific War Papers: Japanese Documents of World War II. University of Nebraska Press. ISBN 978-1597974622.
- Joseph, Paul (2016). The SAGE Encyclopedia of War: Social Science Perspectives. SAGE Publications. ISBN 978-1483359908.
- Jordan, John (2011). Warships after Washington: The Development of Five Major Fleets 1922–1930. Seaforth Publishing. ISBN 978-1848321175.
- Kuehn, John T. (2013). Agents of Innovation: The General Board and the Design of the Fleet that Defeated the Japanese Navy. Naval Institute Press. ISBN 978-1-61251-405-5.
- Kitching, Carolyn J. (2003). Britain and the Problem of International Disarmament: 1919–1934. Routledge. ISBN 978-1134675050.
- Lillard, John M. (2016). Playing War: Wargaming and U.S. Navy Preparations for World War II. University of Nebraska Press. ISBN 978-1612347738.
- McBride, William M. (2000). Technological Change and the United States Navy, 1865–1945. Johns Hopkins University Press. ISBN 978-0801864865.
- Sumrall, Robert (2004). "The Battleship and Battlecruiser". In Gardiner, R (ed.). The Eclipse of the Big Gun. Conway Maritime. ISBN 0-85177-607-8.

Websites

- Blazich, Frank A. (2017). "United States Navy and World War I: 1914–1922". Naval History and Heritage Command. Archived from the original on 16 February 2019.
- "Disarmament Conference, Geneva, 1933". World Digital Library. 1933.
- Hackett, Bob; Kingsepp, Sander & Ahlberg, Lars (2009). "IJN Mutsu: Tabular Record of Movement". Combinedfleet.com. Archived from the original on 18 May 2017.
- "Kellog–Briand Pact". The Avalon Project. 1928. Archived from the original on 17 December 2018.
- "Milestones: 1921–1936 – Washington Naval Conference (a)". Office of the Historian – United States Department of State. Archived from the original on 16 February 2019.
- "Milestones: 1921–1936 – Geneva Naval Convention (b)". Office of the Historian. Archived from the original on 16 February 2019.
- "Treaty Between the United States of America, the British Empire, France, and Japan, Signed at Washington December 13, 1921". Avalon Project. 1921. Archived from the original on 2 May 2018.
- "Washington Conference". Encyclopedia Britannica. 4 August 2016. Archived from the original on 16 February 2019.
