= USS Washington (BB-47) =

Cancelled dreadnought battleship of the United States Navy

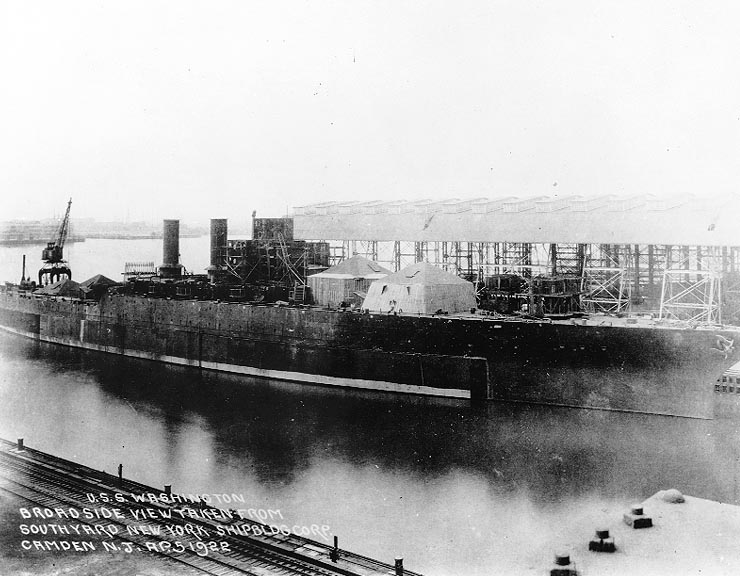
- Incomplete hull of USS Washington (1922)

History

United States
- Name: Washington
- Namesake: Washington
- Builder: New York Shipbuilding Corporation
- Laid down: 30 June 1919
- Launched: 1 September 1921
- Stricken: 8 February 1922
- Fate: Sunk as target, 25 November 1924

General characteristics
- Class & type: Colorado class
- Displacement: 32,600 long tons (33,100 t)
- Length: 624 ft (190 m)
- Beam: 97 ft 6 in (29.72 m)
- Draft: 30 ft 6 in (9.30 m)
- Speed: 21 kn (39 km/h; 24 mph)
- Complement: 1,354 officers and men
- Armament: 8 × 16 in (406 mm)/45 caliber guns; 12 × 5 in (127 mm)/51 caliber guns; 8 × 3 in (76 mm)/23 caliber antiaircraft guns
- Armor: Belt: 8–13.5 in (203–343 mm); Barbettes: 13 in (330 mm); Turret face: 18 in (457 mm); Turret sides: 9–10 in (229–254 mm); Turret top: 5 in (127 mm); Turret rear 9 in (229 mm); Conning tower: 11.5 in (292 mm); Decks: 3.5 in (89 mm)

USS Washington, hull number BB-47, was a Colorado-class battleship and the second ship of the United States Navy named in honor of the 42nd state. Her keel was laid down on 30 June 1919, at Camden, New Jersey, by the New York Shipbuilding Corporation. She was launched on 1 September 1921, sponsored by Miss Jean Summers, the daughter of Congressman John W. Summers of Washington.

On 8 February 1922, two days after the signing of the Washington Naval Treaty for the Limitation of Naval Armaments, all construction work ceased on the 75.9%-completed superdreadnought. She was sunk as a gunnery target on 26 November 1924, by the battleships New York and Texas.

== Design ==
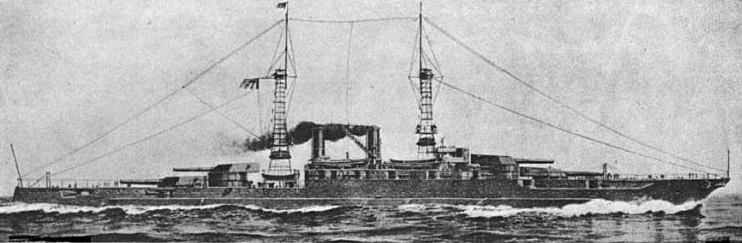
Illustration of the Colorado-class design, created in 1917

In 1916, design work was completed on the next class of battleships to be built for the United States Navy beginning in 1917. These ships were nearly direct copies of the preceding Tennessee class, with the exception of the main battery, which increased from twelve 14-inch (356 mm) guns to eight 16 in (406 mm) guns. The Colorado class proved to be the last class of battleships completed of the standard type.

Washington was 624 ft (190 m) long overall and she had a beam of 97 ft 6 in (29.72 m) and a draft of 30 ft 6 in (9.30 m). She displaced 32,693 long tons (33,218 t) as designed and up to 33,590 long tons (34,130 t) at full load. The ship was powered by four General Electric turbo-electric drives with steam provided by eight oil-fired Babcock & Wilcox boilers. The ship's propulsion system was rated at 28,900 shaft horsepower (21,600 kW) for a top speed of 21 knots (39 km/h; 24 mph). She had a normal cruising range of 8,000 nmi (15,000 km; 9,200 mi) at 10 kn (19 km/h; 12 mph), but additional fuel space could be used in wartime to increase her range to 21,100 nmi (39,100 km; 24,300 mi) at that speed. Her crew numbered 64 officers and 1,241 enlisted men.

She was armed with a main battery of eight 16 in /45 caliber Mark 1 guns in four twin-gun turrets on the centerline, (Note: /45 caliber refers to the length of the gun in terms of caliber. The length of a /45 caliber gun is 45 times its bore diameter.) two forward and two aft in superfiring pairs. The secondary battery consisted of twelve 5-inch (127 mm)/51 caliber guns, mounted individually in casemates clustered in the superstructure amidships. She carried an anti-aircraft battery of eight 3-inch (76 mm)/50 caliber guns in individual high-angle mounts. As was customary for capital ships of the period, she had a 21 in (533 mm) torpedo tube mounted in her hull below the waterline on each broadside. Washington's main armored belt was 8–13.5 in (203–343 mm) thick, while the main armored deck was up to 3.5 in (89 mm) thick. The main battery gun turrets had 18 in (457 mm) thick faces on 13 in (330 mm) barbettes. Her conning tower had 16 in (406 mm) thick sides.

== History ==
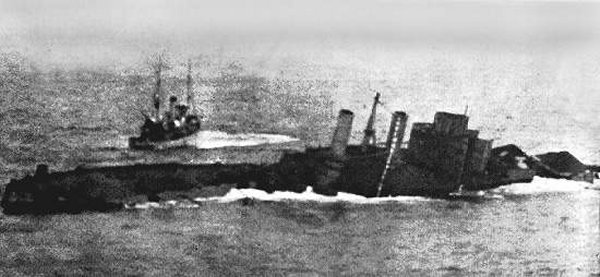
Washington being sunk by gunfire off the Virginia Capes

With fiscal year 1917 appropriations, bids on the four Colorados were opened on 18 October 1916; though Maryland's keel was laid on 24 April 1917. The other three battleships, including Washington, were not laid down until 1919–1920. With the cancellation of the first South Dakota class, the Colorados were the last U.S. battleships to enter service for nearly two decades. They were also the final U.S. battleships to use twin gun turrets—the North Carolina and second South Dakota classes used nine 16-inch/45 caliber Mark 6 guns and the Iowas used nine 16-inch/50 caliber Mark 7 guns in three triple turrets. Washington was laid down on 30 June 1919.

On 8 February 1922, two days after the signing of the Washington Naval Treaty for the Limitation of all Naval Armaments, all construction work was stopped on the 75.9-percent-completed superdreadnought. By that time, she had her underwater armored protection in place.

The ship was towed out in November 1924, to be used as a gunnery target. On the first day of testing, the ship was hit by two 400-pound (180 kg) torpedoes and three 1-metric-ton (1.1-short-ton) near-miss bombs causing minor damage and a list of three degrees. She then had 400 pounds of TNT detonated on board, but remained afloat. Two days later, the ship was hit by fourteen 14-inch (356 mm) shells dropped from 4,000 feet (1,200 m), but only one penetrated. The ship was finally sunk by Texas and New York with fourteen more 14-inch shells. After the test, it was decided that the existing deck armor on battleships was inadequate, and that future battleships should be fitted with triple bottoms, which was underwater armor with three layers.
