= 16-inch/45-caliber Mark 6 gun =

16"/45-caliber gun
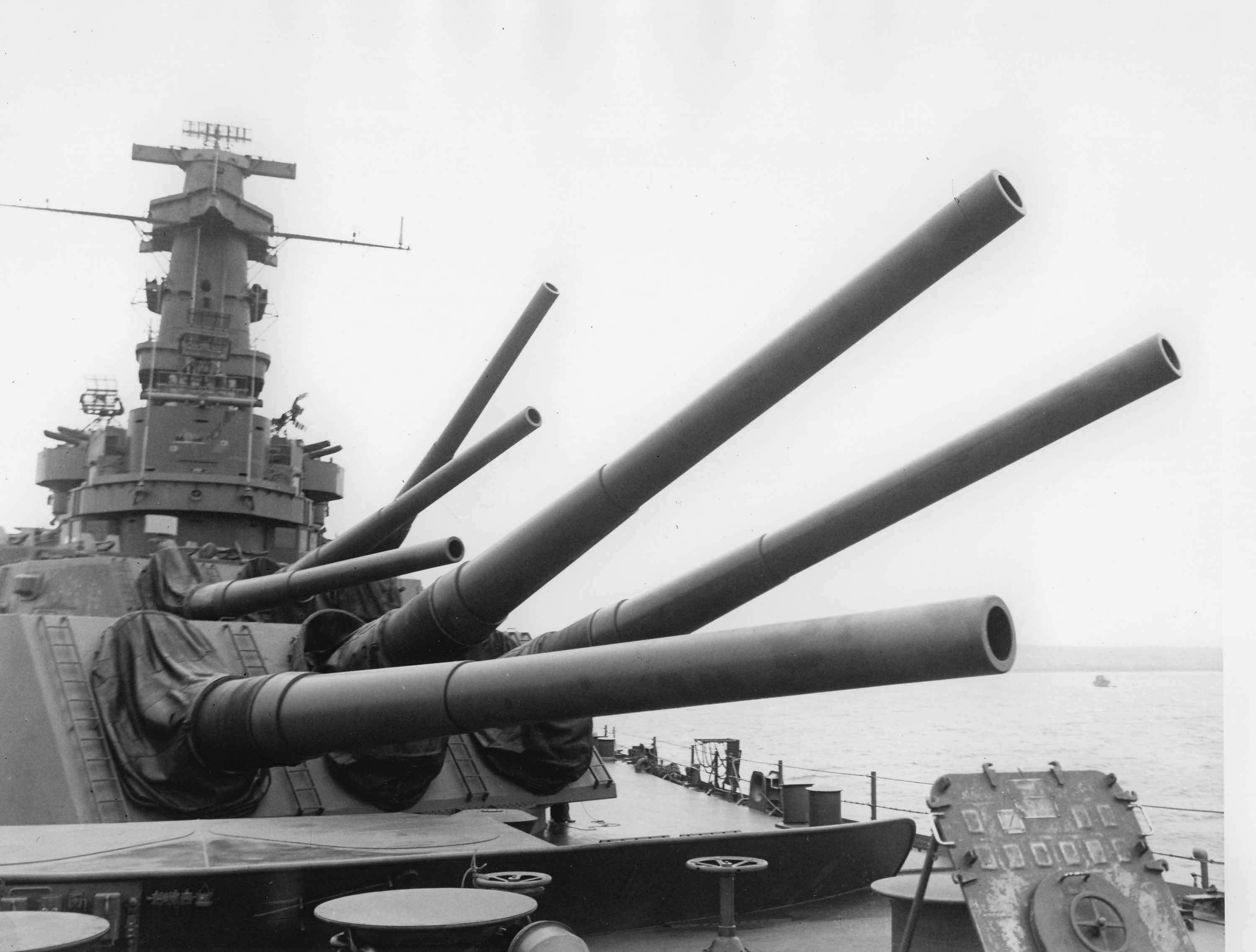
- Battleship armament: 16"/45-caliber guns aboard the battleship USS South Dakota (BB-57).
- Type: Naval gun
- Place of origin: United States

Service history
- In service: 1941–1956
- Used by: US Navy
- Wars: World War II

Production history
- Designed: 1936
- Variants: Mod 0–2

Specifications
- Mass: 192,310 lb (87,230 kg)
- Length: 61 ft 4 in (18.69 m)
- Barrel length: 60 ft (18 m) bore (45 calibers)
- Shell: AP, HC
- Shell weight: AP:2,700 pounds (1,225 kg); HC:1,900 pounds (862 kg)
- Caliber: 16 inch (40.6 cm)
- Recoil: 48-inch (120 cm)
- Elevation: -2° to +45°
- Traverse: -150° to 150°
- Rate of fire: 2 rpm
- Muzzle velocity: AP: 2,300 feet per second (701 m/s); HC: 2,635 feet per second (803 m/s)
- Maximum firing range: 33,741 m (20.966 mi) with AP (on Battleship mount)

The 16"/45-caliber Mark 6 gun is a naval gun designed in 1936 by the United States Navy for their Treaty battleships. It was introduced in 1941 aboard their North Carolina-class battleships, replacing the originally intended 14"/50-caliber Mark B guns and was also used for the follow-up South Dakota class. These battleships carried nine guns in three three-gun turrets. The gun was an improvement to the 16"/45-caliber Mark 5 guns used aboard the Colorado class, and the predecessor to the 16"/50-caliber Mark 7 gun used aboard the Iowa class.

== Description ==
The U.S. Navy had the 16"/50-caliber Mark 2 guns left over from the canceled Lexington-class battlecruisers and South Dakota-class battleships of the early 1920s. However, it was already apparent that the Mark 2 was too heavy to arm the North Carolina and new South Dakota (1939) battleship classes, which had to adhere to the 35,000 long ton standard displacement set by the Second London Naval Treaty. Indeed, the Mark 6 45 caliber "three-gun" turret weighed some 400 long tons (410 t) less than the Mark 2 50-caliber did; also thanks to a decreased barbette size in the Mark 6 the total weight savings over the Mark 2 would be 2,000 long tons (2,000 t),

The Mark 6 16 in/45 guns were improved versions of the Mark 1 guns (upgraded to Marks 5 and 8 in the late 1930s) mounted on the Colorado-class battleships. The Mark 6 had a limit of a 2,240-pound (1,020 kg) shell with a maximum 35,000-yard (32,000 m) range and their turret limit of 30-degree elevation. A considerable upgrade over its predecessor was the Mark 6's ability to fire a new 2,700-pound (1,200 kg) armor-piercing (AP) shell developed by the Bureau of Ordnance. At full charge with a brand-new gun, the heavy shell would be expelled at a muzzle velocity of 2,300 feet per second (700 m/s); at a reduced charge, the same shell would be fired at 1,800 f/s (550 m/s).

Barrel life—the approximate number of rounds a gun could fire before needing to be relined or replaced—was 395 shells when using AP, increasing to 2,860 for practice rounds. By comparison, the 12"/50-caliber Mark 8 gun of the Alaska-class large cruisers had a barrel life of 344 shots, while the 16"/50-caliber Mark 7 gun fitted in the Iowa-class battleships had a barrel life of 290 rounds.

Turning at 4 degrees a second, each turret could train to 150 degrees on either side of the ship. The guns could be elevated to a maximum elevation of 45 degrees; turrets one and three could depress to −2 degrees, but due to its superfiring position, the guns on turret two could only depress to 0 degrees.

Each gun barrel was 61 feet 4 inches (18.69 m) long overall, which is 45 bore diameters, hence the 16"/45-caliber; its bore length was 60 feet (18 m) and rifling length was 51.5 feet (15.7 m). Maximum range was obtained at an elevation of 45 degrees. With the heavy AP shell the maximum range was 36,900 yards (21.0 mi; 33.7 km), and with the lighter 1,900-pound (860 kg) high capacity (HC) shell, 40,180 yards (22.8 mi; 36.7 km). The guns weighed 192,310 lb (87,230 kg; 86 long tons) not including the breech; the turrets weighed slightly over 3,100,000 lb (1,410,000 kg; 1400 long tons).

When firing the same shell, the 16 in/45 Mark 6 had a slight advantage over the 16 in/50 Mark 7 when hitting deck armor—a shell from a 45 cal gun would be slower, meaning that it would have a steeper trajectory as it descended. At 35,000 yards (20 mi; 32 km), a shell from a 45 cal would strike a ship at an angle of 45.2 degrees, as opposed to 36 degrees with the 50 cal.

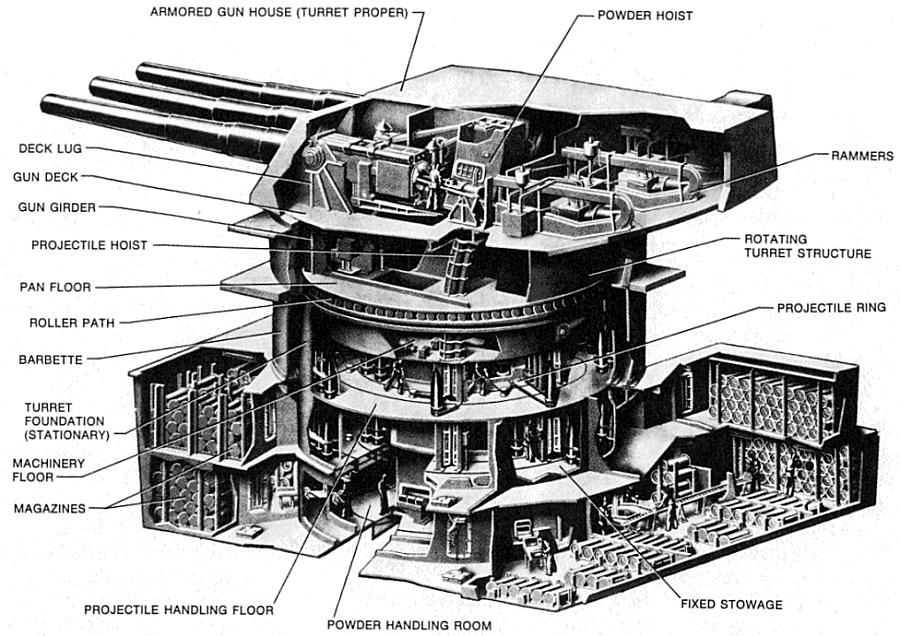
A cut-away diagram of the 16-inch turrets on board the North Carolina class

== Shell ==
The Mark 6 and 7 guns were originally intended to fire the relatively light 2,240-pound (1,020 kg) (1.00 long ton) Mark 5 armor-piercing shell. However, the shell-handling system for these guns was redesigned to use the "super-heavy" 2,700-pound (1,200 kg) APCBC (armor-piercing, capped, ballistic capped) Mark 8 shell before any of the Iowa-class battleships were laid down. The large-caliber guns were designed to fire two different 16-inch (406 mm) shells: an armor-piercing round for anti-ship and anti-structure work, and a high-explosive round designed for use against unarmored targets and shore bombardment.

The Mark 8 shells gave the North Carolina, South Dakota, and Iowa classes the second heaviest broadside of all battleship classes, despite the fact that the North Carolina and South Dakota ships were treaty battleships. Only the Yamato-class could throw more weight. The Mark 6's disadvantage relative to other contemporary battleship classes was its comparatively shorter range.

The propellant consists of small cylindrical grains of smokeless powder with an extremely high burning rate. A maximum charge consists of six silk bags, each filled with 110 pounds (50 kg) of propellant.

== Service history ==
The Mark 6 16-inch gun holds several distinctions relating to the United States' World War II combat history.

In the first instance, the battleship USS Massachusetts (BB-59) employed these 16"/45-caliber guns as her primary armament, and she is believed to have fired the United States' first and last 16-inch shells of World War II; the first use occurring on 8 November 1942 during the Naval Battle of Casablanca (shortly before the Naval battle of Guadalcanal), the last on 9 August 1945 off the coast of Hamamatsu, Japan. Furthermore, their use at Casablanca was the only time that a fast battleship of the US Navy fired its guns in anger in the European theater, which was also one of the two engagements in World War II where the US Navy's fast battleship dueled an enemy battleship. Massachusetts' heavy 16-inch AP shells caused significant damage to the incomplete battleship Jean Bart although few of the shells actually exploded because they had been fitted with fuzes manufactured in 1918. One of Massachusetts' hits penetrated both of Jean Bart's armor decks and exploded in the empty magazines for the missing 152 mm guns, had this magazine been full of propellant charges the resulting explosion could have destroyed the vessel, while Massachusetts' fifth salvo jammed the rotating mechanism of Jean Bart's sole operational main battery turret.

In the second instance, as the primary armament of USS Washington (BB-56) these guns were employed against the Imperial Japanese Navy's Kirishima (a much older and less powerful ship, armed with 8 × 14-inch guns and originally built as a battlecruiser during World War I) during the Naval battle of Guadalcanal; this has been cited by historians as the only instance in World War II in which one American battleship actually sank an enemy battleship. (While there was a battleship-versus-battleship engagement at Leyte Gulf, torpedoes rather than gunfire were largely regarded as being responsible for sinking the enemy battleships.) The Washington had the aid of a naval fire control computer—in this case the Ford Instrument Company Mark 8 Range Keeper analog computer used to direct the fire from the battleship's guns, taking into account several factors such as the speed of the targeted ship, the time it takes for a projectile to travel, and air resistance to the shells fired at a target. This gave the US Navy a major advantage in the Pacific War, as the Japanese did not develop radar or automated fire control to a comparable level (although they did have complex mechanical ballistics computers, which had been in use since World War I). Washington was able to track and fire at targets at a greater range and with increased accuracy, as was demonstrated in November 1942, when she engaged Kirishima at a range of 8,400 yards (7,700 m) at night. Using her nine 16"/45-caliber Mark 6 guns, Washington fired 75 rounds of 16-inch AP shells and scored an incredible twenty heavy-caliber hits that critically damaged the Kirishima, which eventually sank. During the same battle, South Dakota also fired off several salvos from her 16"/45 guns before she had to withdraw for repairs due to a faulty circuit breaker.

== Successor ==
The next US Navy battleship class, the Iowa class, did not fall under Treaty weight restrictions and allowed for additional displacement. However, in their original design, the General Board was incredulous that a tonnage increase of 10,000 long tons (10,000 t) would only allow the addition of 6 knots (11 km/h; 6.9 mph)s over the South Dakotas. Rather than retaining the 16"/45-caliber Mark 6 gun used in the South Dakotas, they ordered that future studies would have to include the more powerful (but heavier) 16"/50-caliber Mark 2 guns left over from the canceled Lexington-class battlecruisers and South Dakota-class battleships of the early 1920s. It also allowed the draft of the ships to be increased, meaning that the ships could be shortened (lowering weight) and the power reduced (since a narrower beam reduces drag).

The Mark 2 50-caliber gun turret weighed some 400 long tons (410 t) more than the Mark 6 45 caliber did; the barbette size also had to be increased so the total weight gain was about 2,000 long tons (2,000 t), putting the ship at a total of 46,551 long tons (47,298 t)—well over the 45,000 long ton limit. An apparent savior appeared in a Bureau of Ordnance preliminary design for a turret that could carry the 50-caliber guns in a smaller barbette. This breakthrough was shown to the General Board as part of a series of designs on 2 June 1938. Nonetheless, the Mark 7 gun still weighed about 239,000 pounds (108 000 kg) without the breech, or 267,900 pounds with the breech, considerably heavier than the Mark 6, which weighed 192,310 pounds (87,230 kg).

The Mark 7 had a greater maximum range over the Mark 6: 23.64 miles (38.04 km) vs 22.829 miles (36.740 km). When firing the same conventional shell, the 16"/45-caliber Mark 6 gun used by the treaty battleships of the North Carolina and South Dakota classes had a slight advantage over the 16"/50-caliber Mark 7 gun on the Iowa class, when hitting deck armor—a shell from a 45 cal gun would be slower, meaning that it would have a steeper trajectory as it descended. At 35,000 yards (20 mi; 32 km), a shell from a 45 cal would strike a ship at an angle of 45.2 degrees, as opposed to 36 degrees with the 50 cal.

Barrel life—the approximate number of rounds a gun could fire before needing to be relined or replaced—was 395 shells when using AP, increasing to 2,860 for practice rounds. By comparison, the 12"/50-caliber Mark 8 gun of the Alaska-class large cruisers had a barrel life of 344 shots, while the 16"/50-caliber Mark 7 gun fitted in the Iowa-class battleships had a barrel life of 290 rounds.

Most World War II large scale naval battles involving the US Navy were fought by carrier-based aircraft in the Pacific, and so the chief use of the US Navy's battleship guns was shore bombardment. Nonetheless, the Mark 6 guns saw ship-to-ship combat in the Pacific and European theaters. This was attributed to the fact that ships mounting the Mark 7 batteries, the Iowa class, were commissioned later than the Mark 6-equipped North Carolina and South Dakota classes, so they missed the Naval Battles of Casablanca and Guadalcanal, two of the few instances where the US Navy's battleships were deployed to fight other battleships. Operation Hailstone was the only instance when the Mark 7 guns were fired purely at surface ships, against two light cruisers and three destroyers, in a somewhat controversial surface action as US Navy carrier aircraft were available and could have achieved similar results.

== See also ==
- 40.6 cm SK C/34 gun – German equivalent
- BL 16 inch Mk I naval gun – British equivalent
- 41 cm/45 3rd Year Type naval gun – Japanese equivalent

== Bibliography ==
- Garzke, William H.; Dulin, Robert O. (1980). Battleships: Allied Battleships in World War II. Annapolis, Maryland: Naval Institute Press. ISBN 0-87021-100-5. OCLC 6355577.
- USS Massachusetts (BB-59). Turner Publishing Company. 1997. ISBN 1-56311-263-9. OCLC 38874740.
