= Standard-type battleship =

Group of US Navy battleship classes

The Standard-type battleship was a series of thirteen battleships across five classes ordered for the United States Navy between 1911 and 1916 and commissioned between 1916 and 1923. These were considered super-dreadnoughts, with the ships of the final two classes incorporating many lessons from the Battle of Jutland.

Each vessel was produced with a series of progressive innovations, which contributed to the pre–World War I arms race. The twelve (Note: The thirteenth, USS Washington, was scrapped as a result of the Washington Naval Treaty.) vessels commissioned constituted the US Navy's main battle line in the interwar period, while many of the ten earlier dreadnoughts were scrapped or relegated to secondary duties. Restrictions under the 1922 Washington Naval Treaty limited total numbers and size of battleships and had required some under construction to be cancelled, so it was not until the onset of World War II that new battleships were constructed. On 7 December 1941, eight were at Pearl Harbor, one at Bremerton, Washington, and three were assigned to the Atlantic Fleet.

== Doctrine ==
The Standard type, by specifying common tactical operational characteristics between classes, allowed battleships of different classes to operate together as a tactical unit (BatDiv) against enemy battleships. By contrast, other navies had fast and slow battleship classes that could not operate together unless limited to the performance of the ship with slowest speed and widest turning circle. Otherwise the battle line would be split into separate "fast" and "slow" wings. The Standard type was optimized for the battleship-centric naval strategy of the era of their design.

The next US battleship classes, beginning with the North Carolina class designed in the late 1930s and commissioned in 1941, marked a departure from the Standard type, introducing the fast battleships needed to escort the aircraft carriers that came to dominate naval strategy.

== List of Standard-type battleships ==
Ship name	Class	Hull No.	Builder	Laid down	Launched	Commissioned	Decommissioned	Fate
Nevada	Nevada	BB-36	Bethlehem Steel Corporation, Fore River Shipyard, Quincy, Massachusetts	4 November 1912	11 July 1914	11 March 1916	29 August 1946	Struck 12 August 1948; sunk as a target, 31 July 1948
Oklahoma	Nevada	BB-37	New York Shipbuilding Corporation, Camden, New Jersey	26 October 1912	23 March 1914	2 May 1916	1 September 1944	Struck 1 September 1944; hulk sank while under tow, 17 May 1947
Pennsylvania	Pennsylvania	BB-38	Newport News Shipbuilding Company, Newport News, Virginia	27 October 1913	16 March 1915	12 June 1916	29 August 1946	Target ship, Operation Crossroads; scuttled, 10 February 1948
Arizona	Pennsylvania	BB-39	New York Naval Shipyard	16 March 1914	19 June 1915	17 October 1916	29 December 1941	Sunk during the attack on Pearl Harbor, 7 December 1941
New Mexico	New Mexico	BB-40	Brooklyn Navy Yard, New York City	14 October 1915	13 April 1917	20 May 1918	19 July 1946	Struck 25 February 1947; broken up at Newark, 1947
Mississippi	New Mexico	BB-41	Newport News Shipbuilding, Newport News	5 April 1915	25 January 1917	18 December 1917	17 September 1956	Struck 17 September 1956; broken up at Baltimore, 1956
Idaho	New Mexico	BB-42	New York Shipbuilding Corporation, Camden	20 January 1915	30 June 1917	24 March 1919	3 July 1946	Broken up at Newark, 1947
Tennessee	Tennessee	BB-43	New York Naval Shipyard	14 May 1917	30 April 1919	3 June 1920	14 February 1947	Struck 1 March 1959; sold for scrap, 10 July 1959
California	Tennessee	BB-44	Mare Island Naval Shipyard	25 October 1916	20 November 1919	10 August 1921	14 February 1947	Struck 1 March 1959; sold for scrap, 10 July 1959
Colorado	Colorado	BB-45	New York Shipbuilding Corporation, Camden, New Jersey	29 May 1919	22 March 1921	30 August 1923	7 January 1947	Struck 1 March 1959; sold for scrap, 23 July 1959
Maryland	Colorado	BB-46	Newport News Shipbuilding Company, Newport News, Virginia	24 April 1917	20 March 1920	21 July 1921	3 April 1947	Struck 1 March 1959; sold for scrap, 8 July 1959
Washington	Colorado	BB-47	New York Shipbuilding Corporation, Camden, New Jersey	30 June 1919	1 September 1921	—N/a		Cancelled after signing of Washington Naval Treaty; sunk as target, 25 November 1924
West Virginia	Colorado	BB-48	Newport News Shipbuilding Company, Newport News, Virginia	12 April 1920	17 November 1921	1 December 1923	9 January 1947	Struck 1 March 1959; sold for scrap, 24 August 1959

=== Characteristics ===
Characteristics of the Standard type included:

- all-or-nothing armor scheme
- All main guns on the centerline in fore and aft turrets with no amidships guns
- designed range of about 8,000 nautical miles (15,000 km) at economical cruising speed
- top speed of 21 knots (39 km/h)
- tactical turn radius of 700 yards

The Colorado class, the first US battleships to mount 16-inch (406 mm) guns, represented the endpoint of the gradual evolution of the "Standard Type" battleships. The Colorado-class battleships were 624 feet (190 m) long, displaced 32,600 tons, had a top speed of 21 knots (39 km/h), and carried a main battery of eight 16-inch (406 mm) guns.

The next planned class of Standard battleships, the six never-completed South Dakotas, represented a significant increase in size and armament over the Colorados. They would have been 684 feet (208 m) long, displaced 43,200 tons, had a top speed of 23 knots (43 km/h), and carried 12 16-inch (406 mm) guns. Nonetheless, the design characteristics of the South Dakotas closely followed the Standard-type battleship, albeit at a greater scale. Like the Tennessees and Colorados, they were designed with the same bridges, lattice masts and turbo-electric propulsion system and they used the same torpedo protection system as the latter class. Naval historian Norman Friedman described the South Dakotas as the ultimate development of the series of U.S. battleships that began with the Nevada class, despite the increase in size, speed and intermediate armament from the standard type that characterized the Nevada through Colorado classes.

== Service history ==
=== World War I ===
All the Standard-types were oil-burning. Since oil was scarce in the British Isles, only Nevada and Oklahoma actively participated in World War I by escorting convoys across the Atlantic Ocean between the United States and Britain.

=== Interwar years ===
All the Standard types were modernized during the 1920s and 1930s. The cage masts of all but the Tennessee and Colorado classes were replaced with tripod masts topped with fire-control directors, torpedo tubes were removed and anti-aircraft guns were upgraded. Main battery elevation in the older ships was increased to 30 degrees for greater range. Most of the Standards received anti-torpedo bulges. Each ship received one or two catapults and recovery cranes for operating floatplanes for scouting and gunnery spotting.

=== World War II ===
On 7 December 1941, Colorado was undergoing a refit to install new torpedo bulges at Puget Sound Navy Yard, while the three ships of the New Mexico class were assigned to the Atlantic Fleet. The remaining eight Standard type battleships were at Pearl Harbor, Pennsylvania in drydock at the Pearl Harbor Naval Shipyard and the other seven forming Battleship Row.

During the Pearl Harbor attack, Arizona's forward magazine exploded from a bomb hit and Oklahoma capsized after multiple torpedo strikes, both with significant losses of life. West Virginia and California were also sunk, while Nevada managed to get underway and was beached shortly afterward. Tennessee and Maryland each received two bomb hits.

Arizona and Oklahoma were considered permanent losses, but the other damaged and sunk battleships were salvaged and sent to the West Coast for repairs and reconstruction. Nevada and Pennsylvania received entirely new superstructures with revised secondary armaments of 5"/38 DP guns in twin mounts, as well as numerous new 20 mm and 40 mm AA guns. Tennessee, California and West Virginia were even more thoroughly rebuilt, incorporating not just changes similar to Nevada but increased deck armor, torpedo bulges and improved subdivision and a modern radar and electronics suite, though their widened beam exceeded the Panama Canal restrictions which limited their operations to the Pacific. Maryland, Colorado, and the three New Mexico–class ships were too urgently needed in 1942 to undergo similar rebuilds. Most changes to these ships focused on updating their radar suites and expanding their light AA armaments, though Idaho would receive an updated secondary battery of 5"/38 guns in late 1944 and Maryland received a partial rebuild that was completed in August 1945 just as Japan surrendered.

The ten surviving Standard type battleships served throughout World War II primarily as fire support for amphibious landings. Their low speed relegated them to second line duties as they were too slow to accompany the fleet carriers that had become the dominant combatant. Six of them participated in the last battleship versus battleship engagement in naval history, the Battle of Surigao Strait, where none of them were hit.

=== Fates ===
Arizona and Oklahoma were sunk during the attack on Pearl Harbor on 7 December 1941. Their sister ships Pennsylvania and Nevada were used as targets in the Operation Crossroads atomic tests in 1946; Pennsylvania was not fully repaired after being severely damaged by an air-launched torpedo in the closing days of the Pacific War. In 1946 Mississippi was converted to a test vessel for new gun and missile systems and served until 1956. Most other Standard-type battleships were decommissioned in 1946 or 1947 and placed in the reserve fleet; ultimately all were scrapped by 1961.

== Sources ==
- Friedman, Norman (1985). U.S. Battleships: An Illustrated Design History. Annapolis, Maryland: Naval Institute Press. ISBN 0-87021-715-1.
- Gardiner, Robert (1984). Conway's All the World's Fighting Ships, 1922–1946. Annapolis, Maryland: Naval Institute Press. ISBN 978-0-87021-913-9.
- Morison, Samuel E. (1958). History of United States Naval Operations in World War II: Volume XII: Leyte, June 1944 – January 1945. Boston: Little & Brown. LCCN 47-1571. OCLC 1035611842. OL 24388559M.
