= 16-inch/45-caliber gun =

16"/45 caliber Mark 1, 5, and 8
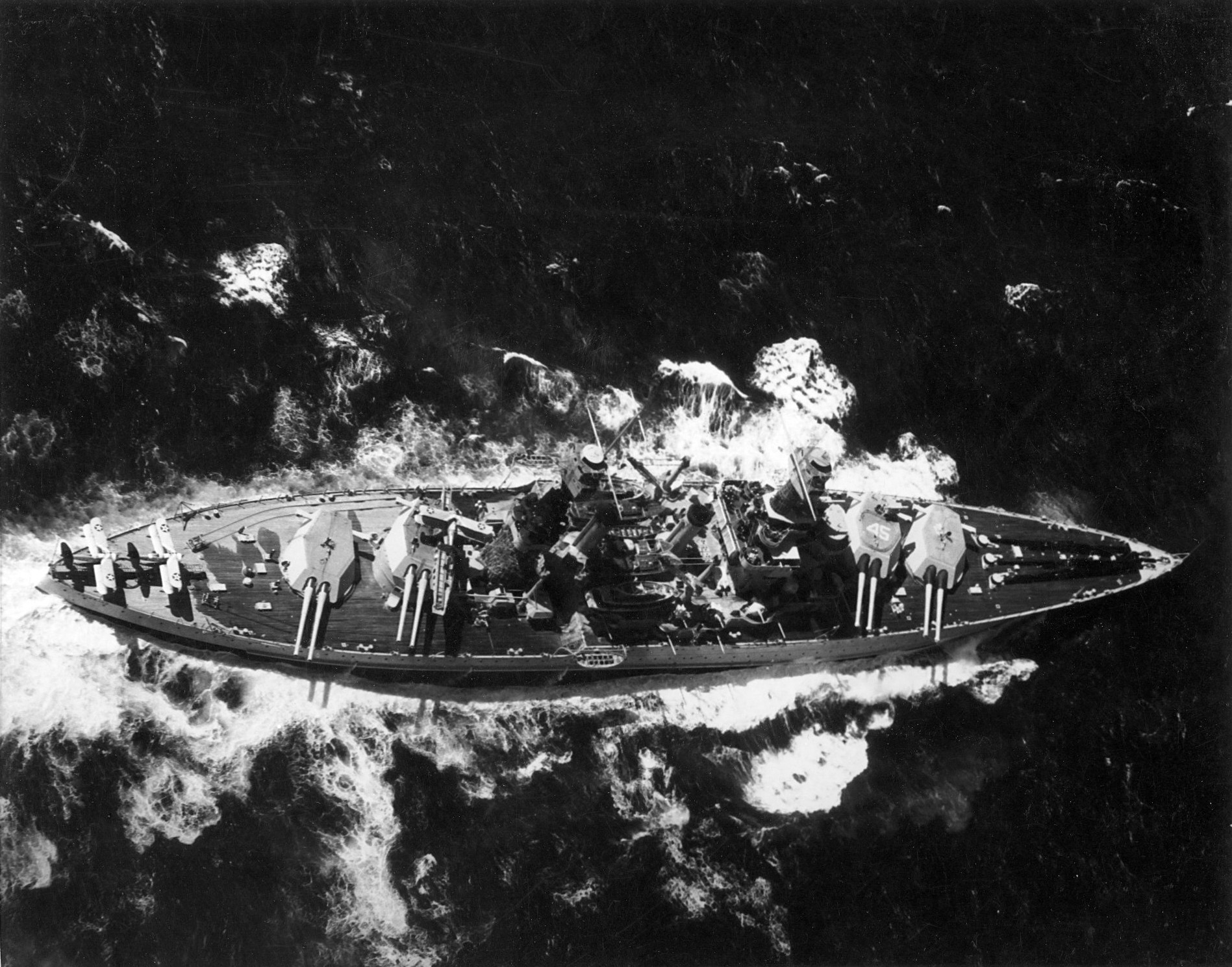
- USS Colorado (BB-45), steams through rough seas, circa 1932, with her 16"/45 caliber gun turrets aimed to starboard.
- Type: Naval gun
- Place of origin: United States

Service history
- In service: 1921–1947
- Used by: United States Navy
- Wars: World War II

Production history
- Designer: Bureau of Ordnance
- Designed: Mark 1: 1913; Mark 5: 1935
- Manufacturer: U.S. Naval Gun Factory; Bethlehem Steel; Watervliet Arsenal
- Produced: 1914–1920
- No. built: Type Gun (45 cal): 1 (prototype); Mark 1: 40 (Gun Nos. 2–41)
- Variants: Marks 1, 5, and 8

Specifications
- Mass: 230,948 lb (104,756 kg) (without breech); 235,796 lb (106,955 kg) (with breech)
- Length: 61 ft 4 in (18.69 m)
- Barrel length: 60 ft 0 in (18.29 m) bore (45 calibers)
- Shell: AP Mark 3: 2,110 lb (960 kg) armor-piercing (AP) (Mark 1 gun); AP Mark 5: 2,240 lb (1,020 kg) AP (Mark 5 and 8 guns); HC Marks 13 and 14: 1,900 lb (860 kg) High explosive (HC) (Mark 5 and 8 guns)
- Caliber: 16 inches (406 mm)
- Elevation: -4° to +30°
- Traverse: 300° max/280° min
- Rate of fire: 1.5 round per minute
- Muzzle velocity: AP Mark 3: 2,600 ft/s (790 m/s); AP Mark 5: 2,520 ft/s (770 m/s) Full Charge; HC Marks 13 and 14: 2,635 ft/s (803 m/s) Full Charge; AP Mark 5: 1,935 ft/s (590 m/s) Reduced Charge; HC Marks 13 and 14: 2,075 ft/s (632 m/s) Reduced Charge
- Effective firing range: AP Mark 3: 22,900-yard (20,940 m) at 15° elevation; AP Mark 5: 23,000-yard (21,031 m) at 15° elevation
- Maximum firing range: AP Mark 3: 34,300-yard (31,364 m) at 30° elevation; AP Mark 5: 35,000-yard (32,004 m) at 30° elevation

The 16"/45 caliber gun (spoken "sixteen-inch-forty-five-caliber") was used for the main batteries of the last class of Standard-type battleships for the United States Navy, the Colorado-class. These guns promised twice the muzzle energy over the Mark 7 12-inch/50 caliber guns of the Wyoming-class battleship and a 50% increase over the 14-inch/45 caliber guns of the New York-class, Nevada-class, and Pennsylvania-class battleships.

== Design ==
The 16-inch gun was a built-up gun constructed in a length of 45 calibers. The Mark 1 had an A tube, jacket, liner, and seven hoops, four locking rings and a screw-box liner. When the gun was designed in August 1913 it was referred to as the "Type Gun (45 Cal.)" as an effort to conceal the gun's true size of 16 inches. Gun No. 1, the prototype, was proof fired in July 1914, less than a year after it was designed. After some minor changes the gun was re-proofed in May 1916 with production approved in January 1917, for Gun Nos. 2–41. Bethlehem Steel was given a contract for 20 guns and an additional 20 castings were ordered from Watervliet Arsenal for assembly at the US Naval Gun Factory at the Washington Navy Yard.

=== Upgrade ===
The Mark 1 guns were upgraded to Marks 5 and 8 in the late 1930s. The Mark 5s have a larger chamber to permit larger charges and a new liner with a heavier taper carbon steel along with a liner locking ring and locking collar. The Mark 8, similar to the Mark 5, had a uniform rifling with a chromium plated bore for increased life.

== Naval service ==
Ships with 16-inch/45-caliber gun installed
Ship	Gun Installed	Gun Mount
USS Colorado (BB-45)	Guns: 16"/45 caliber	Turrets: 4 × Two-gun turrets
USS Maryland (BB-46)	Guns: 16"/45 caliber	Turrets: 4 × Two-gun turrets
USS Washington (BB-47) (cancelled 1922)	Guns: 16"/45 caliber	Turrets: 4 × Two-gun turrets
USS West Virginia (BB-48)	Guns: 16"/45 caliber	Turrets: 4 × Two-gun turrets

== See also ==
- List of naval guns

=== Weapons of comparable role, performance and era ===
- 16-inch/45-caliber Mark 6 gun : successor designed just before WWII
- BL 16 inch Mk I naval gun : British equivalent
- 41 cm/45 3rd Year Type naval gun : Japanese equivalent
