= South Dakota-class battleship (1920) =

Cancelled dreadnought battleship class of the United States Navy

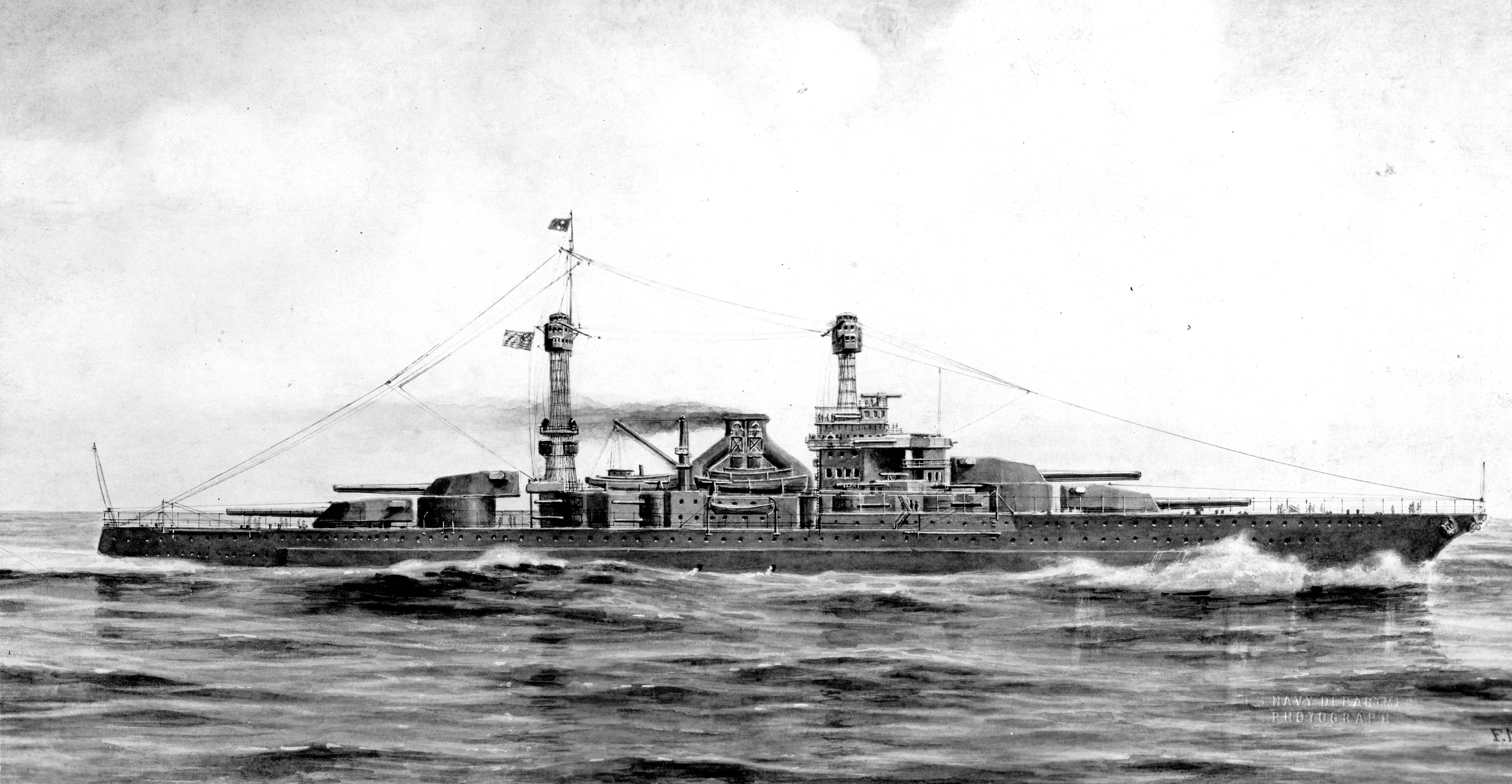
- Artist's concept of the South Dakota class

Class overview
- Name: South Dakota class
- Builders: New York Shipbuilding Corporation; Newport News Shipbuilding; Fore River Shipbuilding; Mare Island Naval Shipyard
- Operators: United States Navy
- Preceded by: Colorado class
- Succeeded by: North Carolina class
- Cost: $21,000,000 (cost limit)
- Built: 1920–1923
- Planned: 6
- Canceled: 6

General characteristics
- Type: Battleship
- Displacement: 43,200 long tons (43,893 t) (normal); 47,000 long tons (47,800 t) (full load)
- Length: 684 ft (208.5 m) (o/a); 660 ft (201.2 m) (waterline)
- Beam: 106 ft (32.3 m)
- Draft: 33 ft (10.1 m)
- Installed power: 12 × water-tube boilers; 60,000 shp (45,000 kW)
- Propulsion: 4 × propeller shafts; 4 × turbo-electric generators
- Speed: 23 knots (43 km/h; 26 mph)
- Range: 8,000 nmi (15,000 km; 9,200 mi) at 10 knots (19 km/h; 12 mph)
- Complement: 137 officers, 1404 enlisted men, 75 marines
- Armament: 4 × triple 16 in (406 mm) guns; 16 × single 6 in (152 mm) guns; 4 × 3 in (76 mm) DP guns; 2 × 21 in (533 mm) torpedo tubes
- Armor: Belt: 8–13.5 in (203–343 mm); Barbettes: 4.5–13.5 in (114–343 mm); Turrets: 5–18 in (127–457 mm); Conning tower: 8–16 in (203–406 mm); Decks: 3.5–6 in (89–152 mm); Bulkheads: 8–13.5 in (203–343 mm); Uptakes: 9–13.5 in (229–343 mm)

The first South Dakota class was a group of six battleships that were laid down in 1920 for the U.S. Navy, but were never completed. Considerably larger and more powerful than the preceding Colorado class, the South Dakota class was designed to achieve 23 knots (43 km/h; 26 mph), they represented an attempt to catch up with the increasing fleet speeds of its main rivals, the British Royal Navy and Imperial Japanese Navy.

The South Dakotas were authorized in 1917, but work was postponed so that the U.S. Navy could incorporate information gained from the Battle of Jutland, fought in mid-1916, in their design. Work was further postponed to give destroyers and other small fighting vessels priority as they were needed urgently to fight German U-boats in the North Atlantic. Construction started only in 1920. As the Washington Naval Treaty of 1922 both restricted the total battleship tonnage allowed the U.S. Navy, and limited individual ship size to 35,000 long tons (35,562 t), construction was halted in early 1922. The unfinished hulls were scrapped the following year, the guns were transferred to the U.S. Army and their boilers and armor were used to modernize older battleships. The class name was not re-used until 1939 when the first of four South Dakota-class fast battleships were laid-down.

== Background and design history ==
Before World War I began in August 1914, the Navy was not well funded by the U.S. Congress, which had failed to heed the General Board's recommendation of a building program of two battleships per year. The election of President Woodrow Wilson in 1912 and his appointment of Josephus Daniels as Secretary of the Navy did nothing to change that as neither man believed that additional expenditures on the Navy were worthwhile. The start of the war began to change that attitude and, in early 1915, the General Board called for construction of four battleships in Fiscal Year (FY) 1916, although the Committee on Naval Affairs rejected that recommendation on the basis that it was not prudent to make changes to the existing program before enough had been learned from the experiences of the war. In parallel with this there arose a belief that a victorious Imperial Germany might be able to invade the United States, including a movie that showed victorious Germans executing Civil War veterans, and that the Navy was unprepared to deal with such a threat.

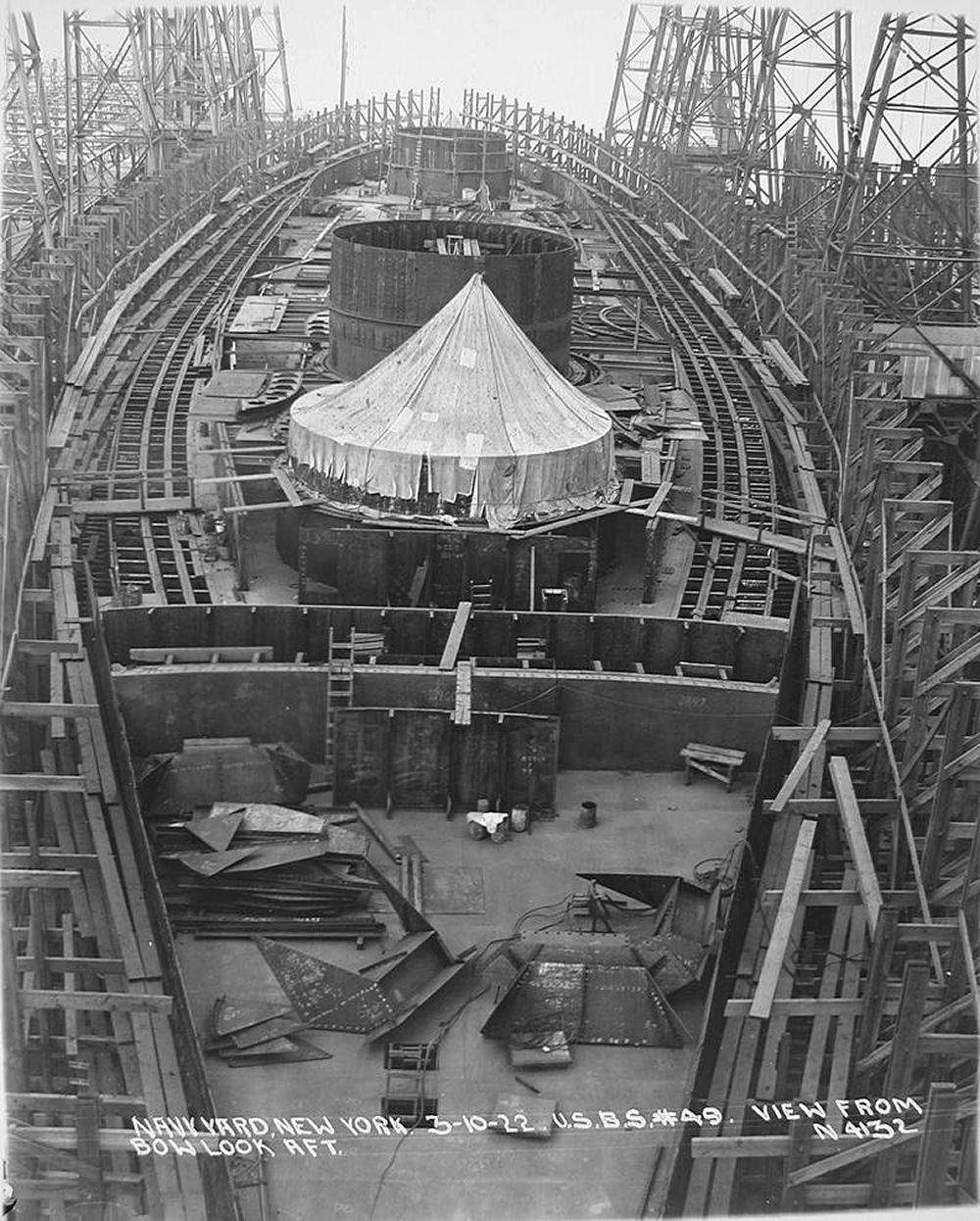
South Dakota under construction

Events abroad like the Japanese Twenty-One Demands on China in early 1915, German attempts to begin unrestricted submarine warfare and the sinking of the Lusitania in May exposed US weaknesses to the public eye. They caused Wilson to reconsider his position and he ordered the Secretaries of War and Navy to plan for mobilization in July. The General Board argued that the Navy should be the equal to the strongest navy in the world, that of the British, not just to the most likely enemy, Imperial Germany, and advocated for construction of 10 battleships over five years, together with battlecruisers and smaller ships. Congress was debating the appropriation bill while the Battle of Jutland occurred in at the end of May 1916 and the British victory confirmed the value of the battleship in eyes of the Congressmen. They compressed the General Board's program into three years with four ships in FY 1917 and three in each of the following years. The first four ships, which became the Colorado class, were only modest improvements over the preceding Tennessee class, but the changed attitude towards battleships allowed the General Board to propose much more powerful, and expensive, ships for the last two batches. The maximum price was set at $21,000,000.

The General Board's requirements were not thoroughly spelled out at the beginning of the design process and it requested a main armament of a dozen 16-inch (406 mm) guns and higher speed than the existing 21 knots of the earlier ships to counter trends it saw in fast foreign battleships like the British Queen Elizabeth and the Japanese Nagato classes. Despite this, higher speed was not a high priority and the board settled for a modest increase of two knots. After a flirtation with a design armed with twelve guns in six twin-gun turrets that came out much larger than desired, successful long-range gunnery trials with the triple turrets used by Pennsylvania caused the Preliminary Design section of the Bureau of Construction and Repair (C&R) to choose four triple gun-turrets for the new ships. This allowed them to base the design on an enlarged version of the Colorados, substituting triple turrets for the twin turrets of the older ships. This increase in the number of main guns was a continuation of Navy practice from the beginning of the dreadnought era. The General Board selected the newly developed 50-caliber Mark 2 gun rather than the older 45-caliber Mark 1 gun because it was much more powerful at a minimal cost in weight. These choices gave the design an estimated displacement of 42,000 long tons (42,674 t). Daniels approved the preliminary characteristics on 20 November 1916 although the Bureau of Ordnance and (C&R) argued about the number and placement of the 51-caliber 5-inch (127 mm) secondary armament for several months before compromising on 20 guns in a mixture of single and twin mounts when the General Board approved the design on 24 January 1917. American entry into the war in April caused the suspension of all capital ship construction in favor of smaller ships more immediately useful to the war effort, although this allowed the Navy to modify the design based on experience gained from the British.

By this time the design was restricted by the limitations imposed by the requirement to the ability to pass through the Panama Canal, a fundamental part of the Navy's strategy as it saved weeks of time when ships had to transfer from the Pacific Ocean to the Atlantic or vice versa. In the meantime the General Board had decided that upon a plethora of changes of which the most significant were substituting a more powerful, but slower firing, six-inch (150 mm) gun for the five-inch guns, thicker deck armor outside the citadel and increased elevation for the sixteen-inch guns. Rear Admiral David W. Taylor, Chief Constructor of the Navy and head of C&R calculated the weight required to implement all of these changes would exceed the board's allowed draft of 32 feet 6 inches (9.9 m) to easily pass through the canal. In an effort to mitigate the impact on the ship's draft by all of these changes and unable to exceed the canal's width of 106 feet (32.3 m), Taylor revised the design by adding length and took the opportunity to improve its torpedo defenses, which increased its length to 725 feet (221 m) and displacement to 46,000 long tons (46,738 t). The board rejected this more expensive design and held to most of its requirements; Daniels approved these changes on 29 January 1918. Taylor investigated sloping the armor, which promised to save a lot of weight, but ultimately decided not to do so. On 6 July, the board changed its draft specification to 33 feet (10.1 m) at normal load, which meant that the ships would have to off-load weight to pass through the canal and dropped its requirement for a gyrostabilizer for which 600 long tons (610 t) had been reserved. This allowed Taylor to add an aft armored transverse bulkhead and armor for the boiler uptakes.

The design characteristics of the South Dakotas closely followed the standard-type battleship, albeit at a greater scale. Like the Tennessees and Colorados, they were designed with the same bridges, lattice masts and turbo-electric propulsion system and they used the same torpedo protection system as the latter class. Naval historian Norman Friedman described the South Dakotas as the ultimate development of the series of U.S. battleships that began with the Nevada class, despite the increase in size, speed and intermediate armament from the standard type that characterized the Nevada through Colorado classes.

== Description ==
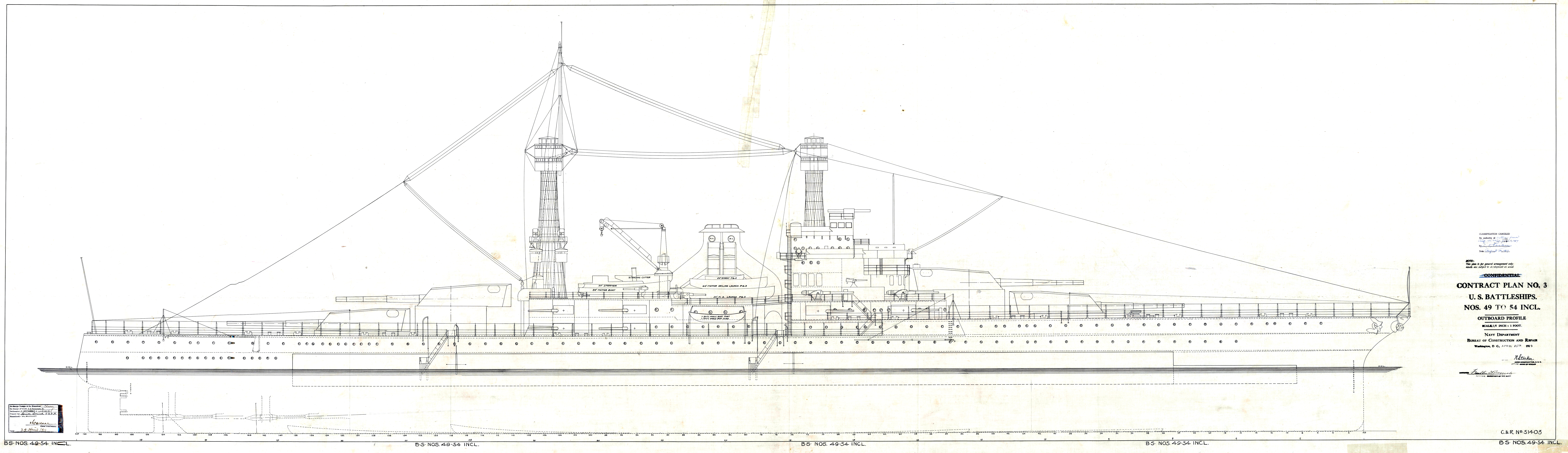
South Dakota-class profile

The South Dakota design called for an overall length of 684 feet (208.5 m), a beam of 106 feet (32.3 m), and a draft of 33 feet (10.1 m) at normal load. They were intended to displace 43,200 long tons (43,893 t) at that load and 47,000 long tons (47,800 t) at deep load, with a metacentric height of 3.47 feet (1.1 m) at deep load. Their crew would have consisted of 137 officers, 1,404 enlisted men and 75 marines.

=== Propulsion ===
Turbo-electric propulsion, which the U.S. Navy had adopted for capital ships with the earlier New Mexico class, was continued in this class. One advantage of turbo-electric drive was that the substitution of flexible electric cables for bulky steam-lines allowed the motors to be mounted further to the stern of the ship; this reduced vibration and weight by shortening the propeller shafts. Another was the ability to go astern at full power without needing a separate reverse turbine to do so, simply by reversing the electrical polarity of the motors. Other benefits were the ability to operate all four propellers if one of the turbo generators failed, and the possibility of operating only some of the generators at low speed with suitably higher loading and greater efficiency. "[Turbo-electric drive] was efficient, rugged and always reliable. But it was also heavy, intricate, and not easy to maintain and keep tuned up." The machinery also required special ventilation measures to dissipate heat and to keep out any salt air. (Note: W. McClelland, quoted in footnote 20) Even with this and elaborate insulation measures, protection from moisture or from flooding due to battle damage or other causes remained problematic and it posed the danger of high voltage to the crew if damaged.

In the South Dakotas, two turbo generators (General Electric for Indiana and Montana, Westinghouse for the others) were coupled to a pair of alternating current (AC) alternators of 28,000 KVA and 5,000 volts. These fed four electric motors, each driving one propeller shaft, rated at 11,200 kilowatts (15,000 hp) of direct current (DC). A dozen water-tube boilers, each in their own individual compartment outboard of the turbine rooms, provided steam for the generators at a working pressure of 285 psi (1,965 kPa; 20 kgf/cm^{2}). The uptakes from each trio of boilers were grouped together and then all four uptakes were trunked together above the upper deck into the single funnel. The ships were also fitted with eight 500-kilowatt (670 hp) DC turbo generators. With a total of 60,000 shaft horsepower (45,000 kW), their designed top speed was 23 knots. They carried enough fuel oil to give them a designed range of 8,000 nmi (15,000 km; 9,200 mi) at 10 knots (19 km/h; 12 mph).

=== Armament ===
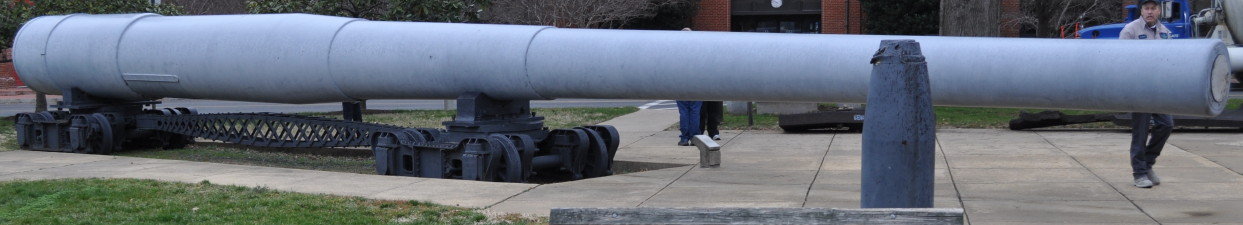
A 16-inch/50 gun on display at the Washington Navy Yard

The main battery of the South Dakota-class ships consisted of twelve 16-inch Mark 2 guns in four triple-gun turrets, a pair of superfiring turrets fore and aft of the superstructure. The only other U.S. Navy battleship with comparable firepower would have been the planned Montana-class battleship which was never laid down, also featuring twelve 16-inch guns in four triple turrets.

The Mark 2 fired the same 2,100-pound (953 kg) shell as the Mark 1 of the Colorado class with a muzzle velocity of 2,650 feet per second (810 m/s) to a range of 45,100 yards (41,200 m) at the turret's maximum elevation of 46 degrees. The Mark 2 ended up not being fitted aboard any ship; when the design of the Iowa-class battleship began in 1938 it was initially assumed these ships would use the surplus Mark 2 guns, but due to a miscommunication between the two Navy departments involved in the design, the Iowas required a lighter gun than the Mark 2/Mark 3 which led to the design of the 267,900 lb (121,500 kg) 16"/50 caliber Mark 7 gun.

The South Dakotas had a secondary armament that consisted of sixteen 53-caliber six-inch Mark 12 guns in single mounts. A dozen of these were in unarmored casemates on the side of the superstructure and the remaining four guns were positioned abreast the forward superstructure. The guns had a maximum range of 21,000 yd (19,000 m) at an elevation of 20 degrees from their 105-pound (48 kg) projectiles at a velocity of 3,000 feet per second (910 m/s). They were installed in Omaha-class cruisers and several large submarines built during the 1920s after the South Dakotas were canceled.

Anti-aircraft defense was provided by four 50-caliber three in (76 mm) dual-purpose guns in single mounts amidships. Firing their 13-pound (5.9 kg) shells at a velocity of 2,700 ft/s (820 m/s), the guns had a maximum range of 14,590 yards (13,340 m) and could fire at a rate of 12–15 rounds per minute. The ships were also fitted with a pair of 21-inch (533 mm) submerged torpedo tubes, one on each broadside.

=== Protection ===
The South Dakotas' belt armor design called for 13.5 inches (340 mm) tapered to 8 inches (203 mm) below the waterline. It extended between the fore and aft turret barbettes and protected the propulsion machinery and magazines. Fore and aft transverse 8–13.5-inch (200–340 mm) bulkheads formed an armored citadel by closing off the ends of the belt. The main deck sat at the top of the armored belt; it was the primary armored deck and consisted of two layers of 1.75-inch (44 mm) thick steel, one of nickel steel (NS) and the other of special treatment steel (STS). Below it was the splinter deck that consisted of 1.25 inches (32 mm) of STS that was intended to catch splinters from shells that burst on the main deck. In front of the forward bulkhead, the splinter deck continued to the bow, although it now consisted of one layer of five inches of STS and another, 1 inch (25 mm) thick, of NS. Between the main and splinter decks, the boiler uptakes were protected by 9–13.5 inches (230–340 mm) of armor.

Turret faces were 18 inches (457 mm) thick, with 9–10-inch (229–254 mm) thick sides and a roof 5 inches thick. The barbettes were protected by 13.5 inches of armor above the main deck and 4.5 inches (114 mm) below that. The conning tower armor was 16 inches thick on the front and sides and it had an 8-inch roof. Underwater protection was similar to that of the Colorados, five layers deep with watertight compartments separated by three torpedo bulkheads 0.75 inches (19 mm) thick that extended from the splinter deck to the ship's bottom and between the transverse bulkheads. The outermost compartment was empty, the three middle ones were used as oil tanks, and the innermost one was also empty.

== Ships in class ==
Name	Shipyard	Laid down	Suspended	Canceled	% Completed	Fate
South Dakota (BB-49)	New York Naval Shipyard	15 March 1920	8 February 1922	17 August 1922	38.5%	Sold for scrap, 25 October 1923
Indiana (BB-50)	New York Naval Shipyard	1 November 1920	8 February 1922	17 August 1922	34.7%	Scrapped on slipway
Montana (BB-51)	Mare Island Naval Shipyard	1 September 1920	8 February 1922	17 August 1922	27.6%	Sold for scrap, 25 October 1923
North Carolina (BB-52)	Norfolk Naval Shipyard	12 January 1920	8 February 1922	17 August 1922	36.7%	Sold for scrap, 25 October 1923
Iowa (BB-53)	Newport News Shipbuilding	17 May 1920	8 February 1922	17 August 1922	31.8%	Sold for scrap, 8 November 1923
Massachusetts (BB-54)	Fore River Shipyard	4 April 1921	8 February 1922	17 August 1922	11.0%	Sold for scrap, 8 November 1923

With the cancellation of the South Dakotas and the Lexington-class battlecruisers, the existing guns were transferred to the U.S. Army and used as coast-defense guns. Their boilers were used to modernize the six ships of the Florida, Wyoming and New York classes in the mid-1920s; their armor plates were used to reinforce the existing armor of other battleships.

== Bibliography ==
- Anderson, Richard M. & Baker, Arthur D. III (1977). "CV-2 Lex and CV-3 Sara". Warship International. XIV (4). Toledo, OH: International Naval Research Organization: 291–328. ISSN 0043-0374.
- Breyer, Siegfried (1973). Battleships and Battle Cruisers, 1905-1970: Historical Development of the Capital Ship. Translated by Alfred Kurti. London: Macdonald and Jane's. ISBN 0-356-04191-3.
- Campbell, John (1985). Naval Weapons of World War Two. Annapolis, Maryland: Naval Institute Press. ISBN 0-87021-459-4.
- Friedman, Norman (1985a). "United States". In Gray, Randal (ed.). Conway's All the World's Fighting Ships 1906–1921. Annapolis, Maryland: Naval Institute Press. ISBN 0-87021-907-3.
- Friedman, Norman (1985b). U.S. Battleships: An Illustrated Design History. Annapolis, Maryland: Naval Institute Press. ISBN 0-87021-715-1.
- Ships' Data, U.S. Naval Vessels. United States Navy. 1 July 1921.
