= Thomas J. Senn =

Thomas Jones Senn
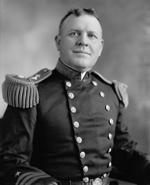
- Born: December 21, 1871; Graniteville, South Carolina
- Died: February 11, 1947 (aged 75); San Diego, California
- Relatives: Capt. E.M. Senn, U.S.N.
- Military career
- Allegiance: United States of America
- Branch: United States Navy
- Service years: 1891 - 1936
- Rank: Rear admiral
- Commands: North Dakota; West Virginia; 11th Naval District; 12th Naval District
- Conflicts: World War I
- Awards: Navy Cross

Thomas Jones Senn (December 21, 1871 – February 11, 1947) was a decorated United States Navy officer with the rank of rear admiral. He was a recipient of the Navy Cross.

== Biography ==
Thomas Jones Senn was born on December 21, 1871, in the small town of Graniteville, South Carolina. Senn attended the United States Naval Academy at Annapolis, Maryland, and graduated in 1891.

During World War I, Senn served as a captain as assistant chief of the Bureau of Navigation, before his transfer to North Dakota. Senn served with USS North Dakota in the waters of Atlantic and was awarded the Navy Cross for his leadership of that ship.

After the war, Senn was appointed the commander of the Naval Torpedo Station. He was subsequently appointed a commanding officer of the West Virginia from her commissioning on December 1, 1923, to May 5, 1925. He later was promoted to rear admiral and served as Assistant Chief of Naval Operations for three years, from 1925 to 1928.

Senn was commandant of the 11th Naval District from 1930 to 1933 and the 12th Naval District in 1935 at the time of the crash of the Macon, a dirigible that was under the command of later West Virginia commanding officer Herbert V. Wiley.

Senn retired from the Navy in 1936 and died on February 11, 1947, at the age of 75 at Naval Hospital in San Diego, California. He was buried at Fort Rosecrans National Cemetery together with his wife Percie B. Senn (1874–1950).

== Navy Cross citation ==
Captain Thomas J. Senn was awarded the Navy Cross for action aboard North Dakota during World War I.

Citation: The Navy Cross is awarded to Captain Thomas J. Senn, U.S. Navy, for exceptionally meritorious service in a duty of great responsibility as commanding officer of the U.S.S. North Dakota, in the Atlantic Fleet.
