= USS West Virginia (BB-48) =

Dreadnought battleship of the United States Navy

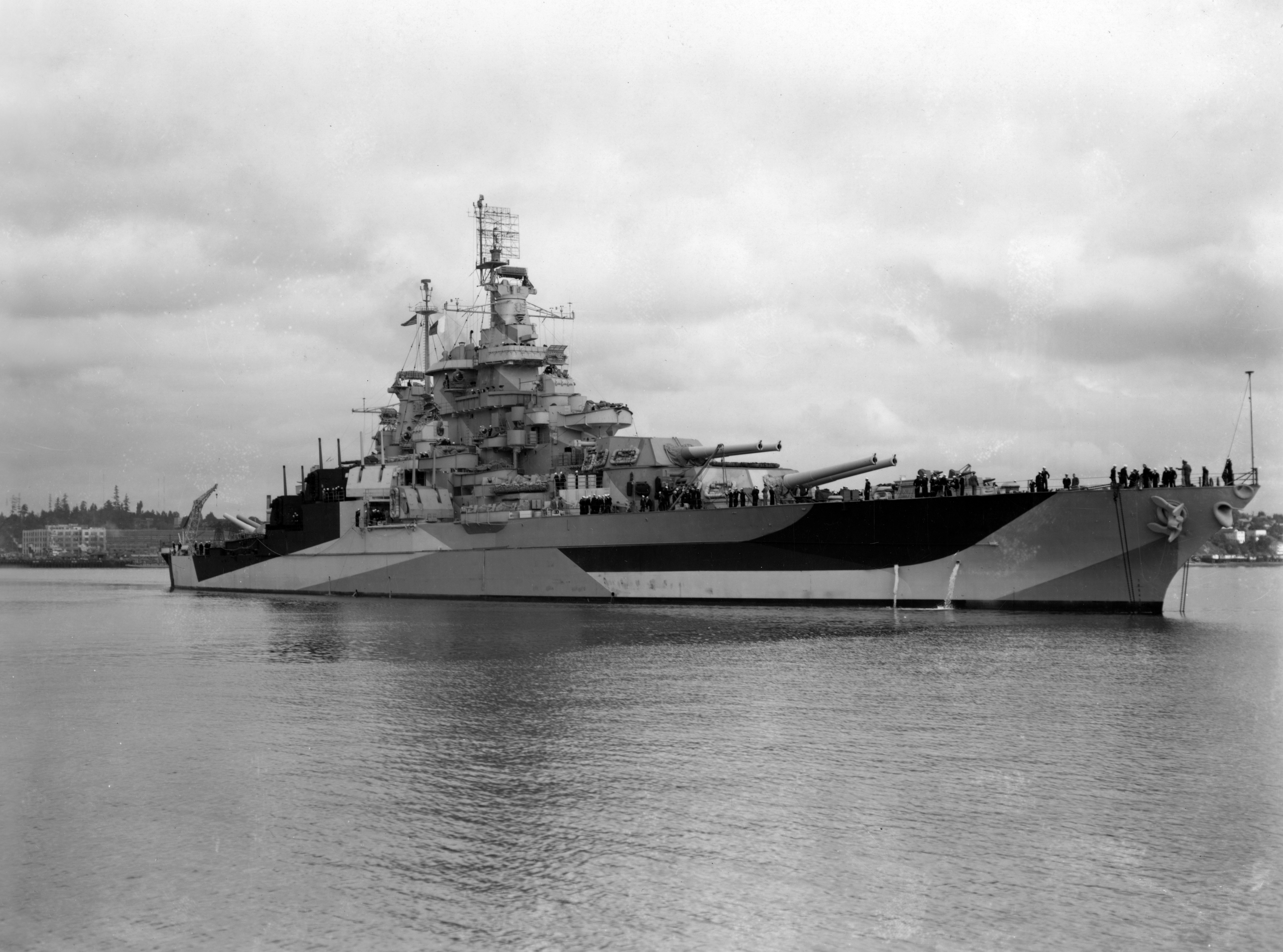
- USS West Virginia (BB-48) after her reconstruction, in July 1944

History

United States
- Name: West Virginia
- Namesake: West Virginia
- Ordered: 5 December 1916
- Builder: Newport News Shipbuilding
- Laid down: 12 April 1920
- Launched: 19 November 1921
- Commissioned: 1 December 1923
- Decommissioned: 9 January 1947
- Stricken: 1 March 1959
- Identification: Hull number: BB-48
- Fate: Sold for scrap, 24 August 1959

General characteristics (Original configuration)
- Class & type: Colorado-class battleship
- Displacement: 32,693 long tons (33,218 t) (design); 33,590 long tons (34,130 t) (full load)
- Length: 624 ft (190 m)
- Beam: 97 ft 6 in (29.72 m)
- Draft: 30 ft 6 in (9.30 m)
- Installed power: 8 × Babcock & Wilcox boilers; 28,900 shp (21,600 kW)
- Propulsion: 4 × General Electric turbo-electric drive; 4 × Propellers
- Speed: 21 kn (39 km/h; 24 mph)
- Range: 8,000 nmi (15,000 km; 9,200 mi) at 10 kn (19 km/h; 12 mph)
- Complement: 64 officers; 1,241 enlisted
- Armament: 8 × 16 in (406 mm)/45 caliber guns; 16 × 5 in (127 mm)/51 caliber guns; 8 × 3 in (76 mm)/50 caliber guns; 2 × 21 in (533 mm) torpedo tubes
- Armor: Belt: 8–13.5 in (203–343 mm); Barbettes: 13 in (330 mm); Turret face: 18 in (457 mm); Conning tower: 16 in (406 mm); Decks: 3.5 in (89 mm)

General characteristics (Final configuration)
- Beam: 114 ft (35 m)
- Sensors & processing systems: CXAM-1 radar
- Armament: 8 × 16 in (406 mm)/45 caliber guns; 16 × 5 in (127 mm)/38 cal guns; 40 × Bofors 40 mm gun guns; 43 × Oerlikon 20 mm cannons

USS West Virginia (hull number BB-48) was the fourth dreadnought battleship of the Colorado class, though because Washington was cancelled, she was the third and final member of the class to be completed. The Colorado class proved to be the culmination of the standard-type battleship series built for the United States Navy in the 1910s and 1920s; the ships were essentially repeats of the earlier Tennessee design, but with a significantly more powerful main battery of eight 16-inch (406 mm) guns in twin-gun turrets. West Virginia was built between her keel laying in 1920 and her commissioning into the Navy in 1923. The ship spent the 1920s and 1930s conducting routine training exercises, including the typically annual Fleet Problems, which provided invaluable experience for the coming war in the Pacific.

West Virginia was moored on Battleship Row on the morning of 7 December 1941 when Japan attacked Pearl Harbor, bringing the United States into World War II. Badly damaged by torpedoes, the ship sank in the shallow water but was later refloated and extensively rebuilt over the course of 1943 and into mid-1944. She returned to service in time for the Philippines Campaign, where she led the American line of battle at the Battle of Surigao Strait on the night of 24–25 October. There, she was one of the few American battleships to use her radar to acquire a target in the darkness, allowing her to engage a Japanese squadron in what was the final action between battleships in naval history.

After Surigao Strait, the ship remained in the Philippines to support troops fighting during the Battle of Leyte in 1944 and then supported the invasion of Lingayen Gulf in early 1945. The ship also took part in the Battles of Iwo Jima and Okinawa later that year, providing extensive fire support to the ground forces invading those islands. During the latter operation, she was hit by a kamikaze that did little damage. Following the surrender of Japan, West Virginia took part in the initial occupation and thereafter participated in Operation Magic Carpet, carrying soldiers and sailors from Hawaii to the mainland United States before being deactivated in 1946. She was decommissioned in 1947 and assigned to the Pacific Reserve Fleet, where she remained until 1959 when she was sold to ship breakers and dismantled.

== Design ==
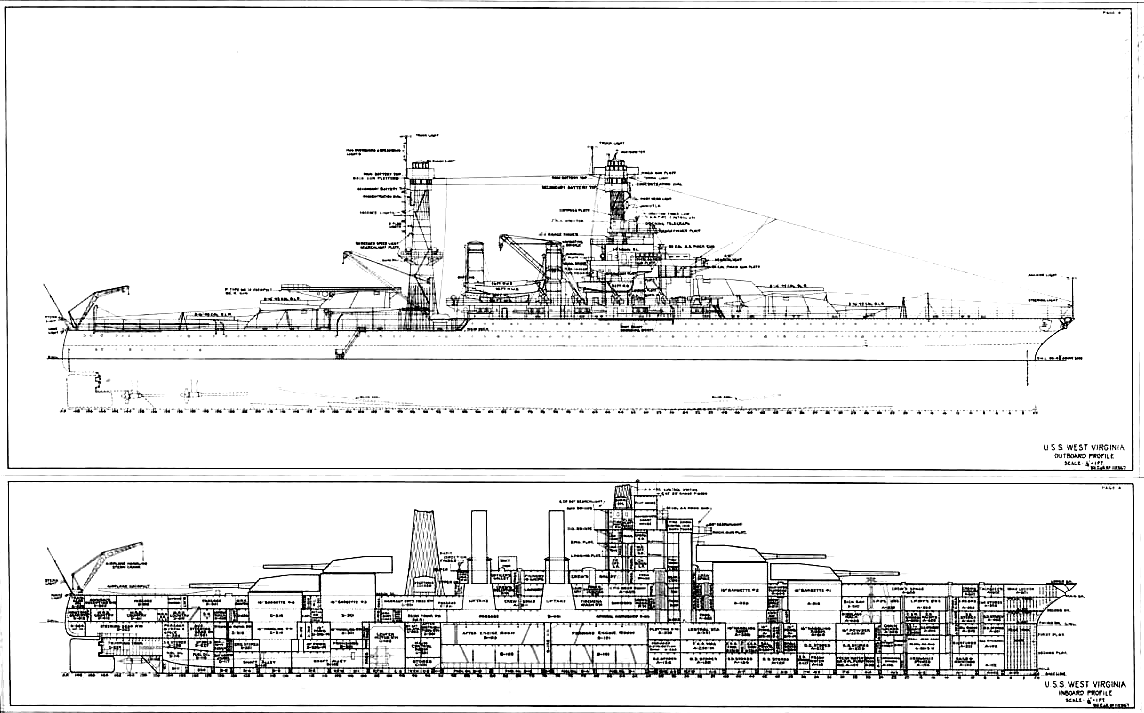
Profile drawing of West Virginia as she appeared in 1930

In 1916, design work was completed on the next class of battleships to be built for the United States Navy beginning in 1917. These ships were nearly direct copies of the preceding Tennessee class, with the exception of the main battery, which increased from twelve 14-inch (356 mm) guns to eight 16 in (406 mm) guns. The Colorado class proved to be the last class of battleships completed of the standard type.

West Virginia was 624 ft (190 m) long overall and she had a beam of 97 ft 6 in (29.72 m) and a draft of 30 ft 6 in (9.30 m). She displaced 32,693 long tons (33,218 t) as designed and up to 33,590 long tons (34,130 t) at full load. The ship was powered by four General Electric turbo-electric drives with steam provided by eight oil-fired Babcock & Wilcox boilers. The ship's propulsion system was rated at 28,900 shaft horsepower (21,600 kW) for a top speed of 21 knots (39 km/h; 24 mph), though on speed trials she reached 31,268 shp (23,317 kW) and a speed of 21.09 kn (39.06 km/h; 24.27 mph). She had a normal cruising range of 8,000 nmi (15,000 km; 9,200 mi) at 10 kn (19 km/h; 12 mph), but additional fuel space could be used in wartime to increase her range to 21,100 nmi (39,100 km; 24,300 mi) at that speed. Her crew numbered 64 officers and 1,241 enlisted men.

She was armed with a main battery of eight 16 in /45 caliber Mark 1 guns in four twin-gun turrets on the centerline, (Note: /45 caliber refers to the length of the gun in terms of caliber. The length of a /45 caliber gun is 45 times its bore diameter.) two forward and two aft in superfiring pairs. The secondary battery consisted of sixteen 5-inch (127 mm)/51 caliber guns, mounted individually in casemates clustered in the superstructure amidships. She carried an anti-aircraft battery of eight 3-inch (76 mm)/50 caliber guns in individual high-angle mounts. As was customary for capital ships of the period, she had a 21 in (533 mm) torpedo tube mounted in her hull below the waterline on each broadside. West Virginia's main armored belt was 8–13.5 in (203–343 mm) thick, while the main armored deck was up to 3.5 in (89 mm) thick. The main battery gun turrets had 18 in (457 mm) thick faces on 13 in (330 mm) barbettes. Her conning tower had 16 in (406 mm) thick sides.

== Service history ==
=== Prewar career ===
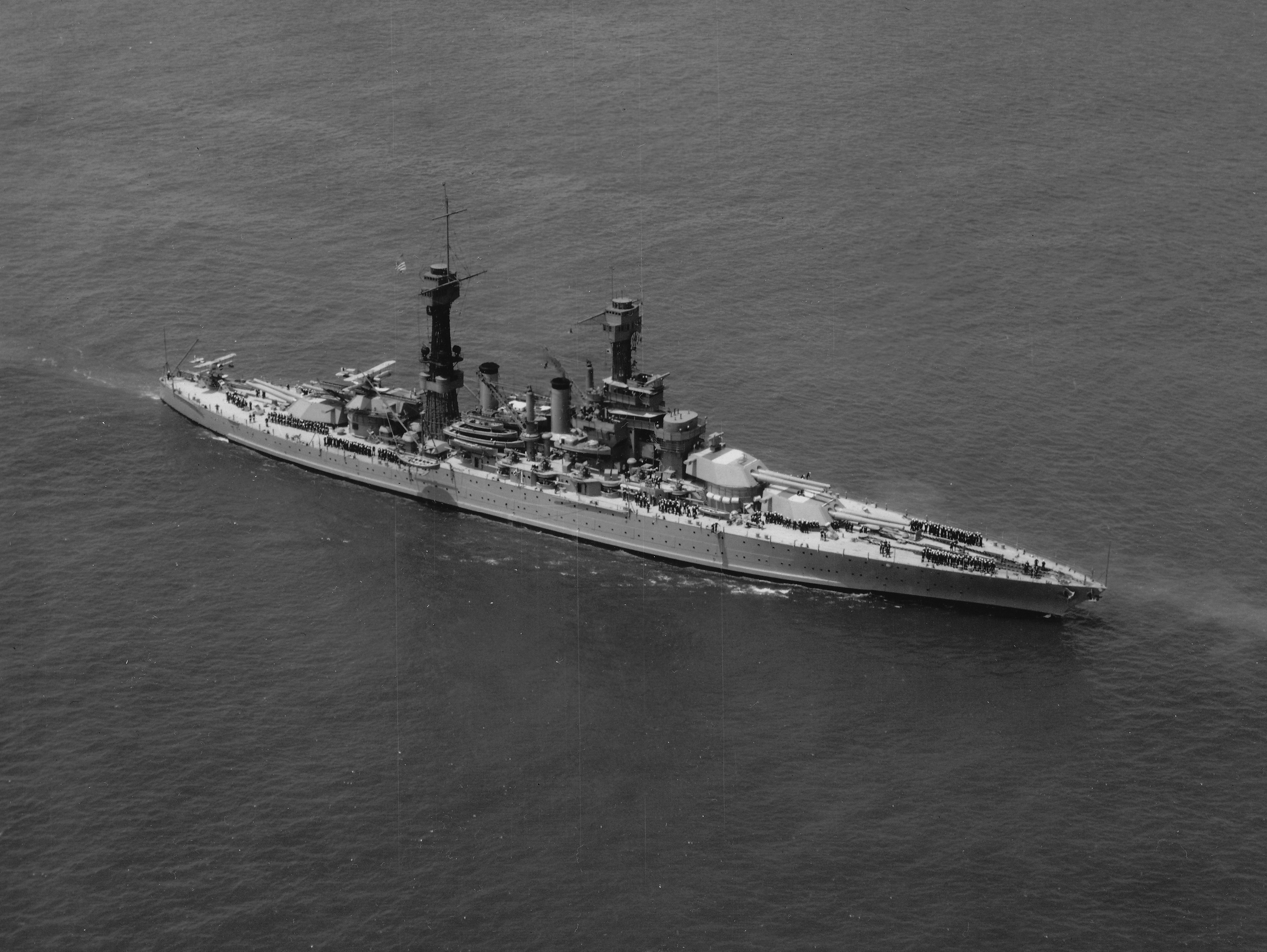
West Virginia during a naval review in 1927

The keel for West Virginia was laid down at the Newport News Shipbuilding Company of Newport News, Virginia on 12 April 1920. While under construction, she received the hull number BB-48 on 17 July. Her completed hull was launched on 19 November 1921 and she was commissioned on 1 December 1923. West Virginia was to have been the fourth member of the class, but her sister ship Washington was cancelled due to the Washington Naval Treaty that was signed in 1922. Captain Thomas J. Senn was the ship's first commander. On entering service, she began sea trials and a shakedown cruise, followed by repairs at Newport News. She then sailed north to the New York Navy Yard for further alterations. She then steamed south to Hampton Roads, and while en route her steering gear malfunctioned. She underwent an overhaul there to correct the problem and she got underway again on 16 June 1924; while cruising through Lynnhaven Channel at 10:10, the telegraphs for the engine room and steering compartment lost power, rendering the ship unmaneuverable. Senn had to use voice tubes to communicate with the engine room, ordering the port engines to full power and the starboard to stop in an attempt to steer the ship away from the shore. But West Virginia drifted in the channel and ran aground, though she was not damaged in the accident. A subsequent inquiry into the incident faulted incorrect navigational data that exaggerated the size of the navigable part of the channel, exonerating Senn and the ship's navigator.

On 30 October, West Virginia became the flagship for the Commander, Battleship Divisions, Battle Fleet. The ship spent the 1920s conducting routine training exercises and maneuvers with the fleet, punctuated by periodic overhauls; each year's training schedule culminated in the major Fleet Problems that tested operational and strategic doctrine that proved to be critical in the operations conducted against Japan during World War II. These operations took place in the Atlantic and Pacific Oceans, as far north as Alaska and as far south as Panama. In 1925, while Captain Arthur Japy Hepburn commanded the ship, her gunners scored first place during a competition for short range shooting. West Virginia won the Battle Efficiency ribbon that year as well. Later in 1925, the fleet conducted joint Army-Navy maneuvers in Hawaii to test the defenses of the islands before embarking on a major cruise to visit Australia and New Zealand. West Virginia won Battle Efficiency ribbons in 1927, 1932, and 1933. During Fleet Problem X in March 1930, West Virginia was "bombed" by aircraft from the aircraft carrier Lexington. In Fleet Problem XI, held the following month, she and the battleship Tennessee accidentally engaged the carrier Saratoga, a fellow member of the "black" fleet, mistaking her for the "blue" fleet carrier Lexington. The simulated friendly fire cost "black" fleet their carrier and led to calls for improved communication between ships and better ship identification training.

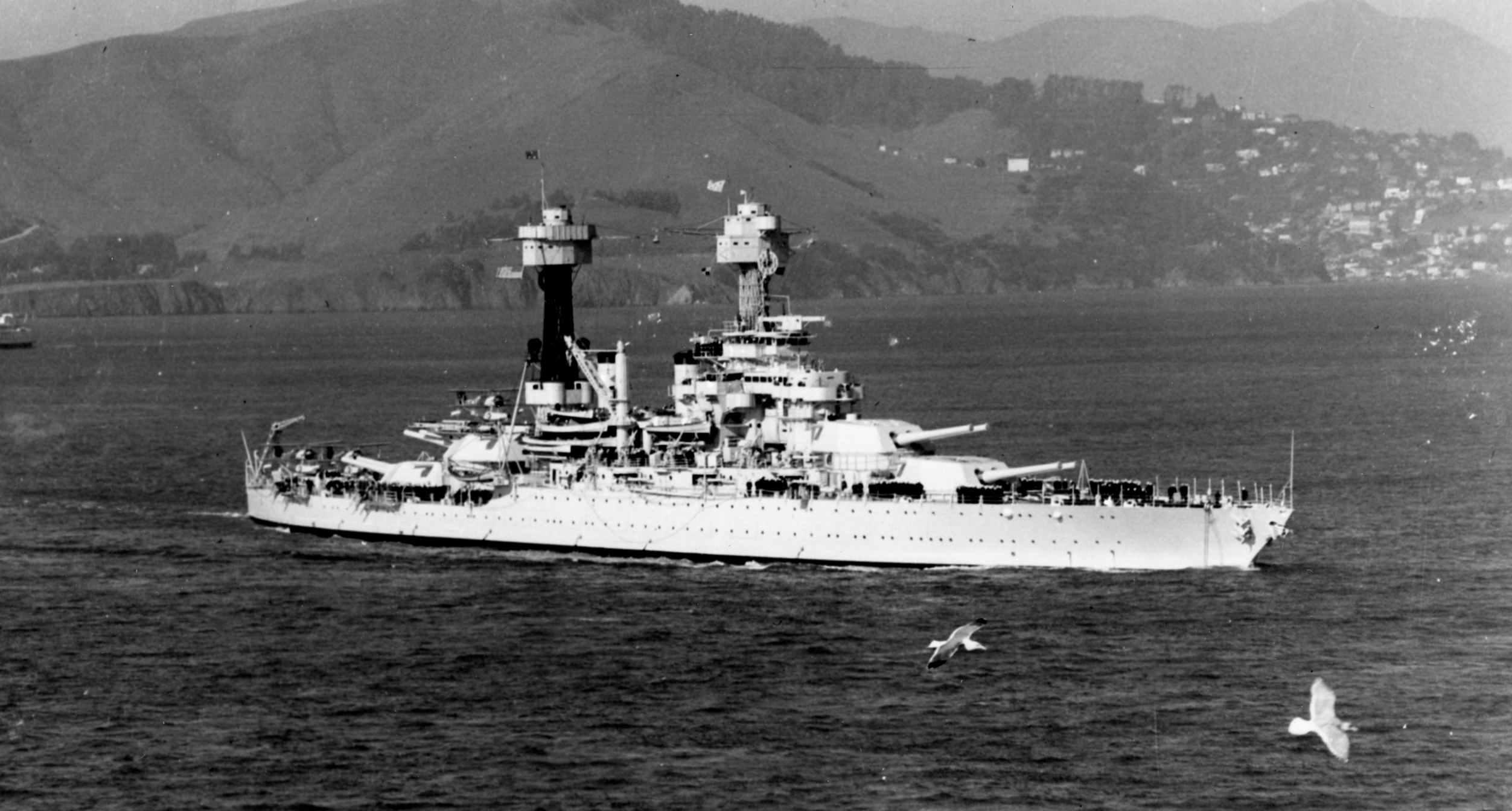
West Virginia in San Francisco Bay, c. 1934

In the early 1930s, the ship underwent a minor modification. Her battery of 3-inch anti-aircraft guns were replaced with 5-inch /25 cal. guns and .50-caliber machine guns were installed on her fore and main masts. She also received aircraft catapults on her quarterdeck and atop the rear superfiring turret. During Fleet Problem XIV in February 1933, West Virginia and the battleship Arizona were "damaged" in a surprise attack by "black" fleet submarines. Plans to modernize West Virginia dated to the mid-1930s, when the navy considered modifying the ship extensively; the Bureau of Construction and Repair planned to add anti-torpedo bulges that would have restored a considerable amount of buoyancy to the hull, raising her 20 in (510 mm) at the cost of an additional 2,000 long tons (2,032 t) displacement. The work was not carried out, and in 1937 further plans to modernize West Virginia, her sister ships, and the two Tennessee-class ships, were considered. The proposed modifications included new boilers and fire control equipment and the previously suggested bulges. Further development of the modernization program in 1938 was rejected due to its cost and the fact that, even as modernized, the vessels would be inferior to the new North Carolina and South Dakota-class battleships being built.

Following the outbreak of World War II in 1939, Admiral Ernest King led a board to evaluate anti-aircraft defenses of the fleet's ships, and it recommended adding blisters to restore freeboard, the adoption of 5 in /38 cal. dual-purpose guns, and a strengthening of the ships' decks. The Chief of Naval Operations decided that, as a result of the likelihood of war, only the bulges would be fitted, and West Virginia was slated to undergo the work from 10 May to 8 August 1941, though the modification was not carried out. The Navy conducted the final iteration of the series, Fleet Problem XXI, in April 1940, by which time tensions with Japan over the latter's initiation of the Second Sino-Japanese War had led the United States to transfer the fleet from California to Pearl Harbor in Hawaii as a deterrent to further aggression by Japan. The fleet spent 1941 occupied with extensive training to prepare for the anticipated war with Japan, even after the diplomatic situation increasingly worsened in the final months of the year. During this period, the Navy sought to improve the anti-aircraft batteries of the fleet's battleships, but production of the new 1.1 in (28 mm) guns was slow, so old 3 in guns were reinstalled as a temporary measure. The ship also had eleven .50-cal. machine guns by this time. In June, men aboard West Virginia fabricated an experimental gun shield for the 5 in guns, which were to be applied to other ships. West Virginia was to have had her 1.1 in guns installed in February 1942.

=== World War II ===
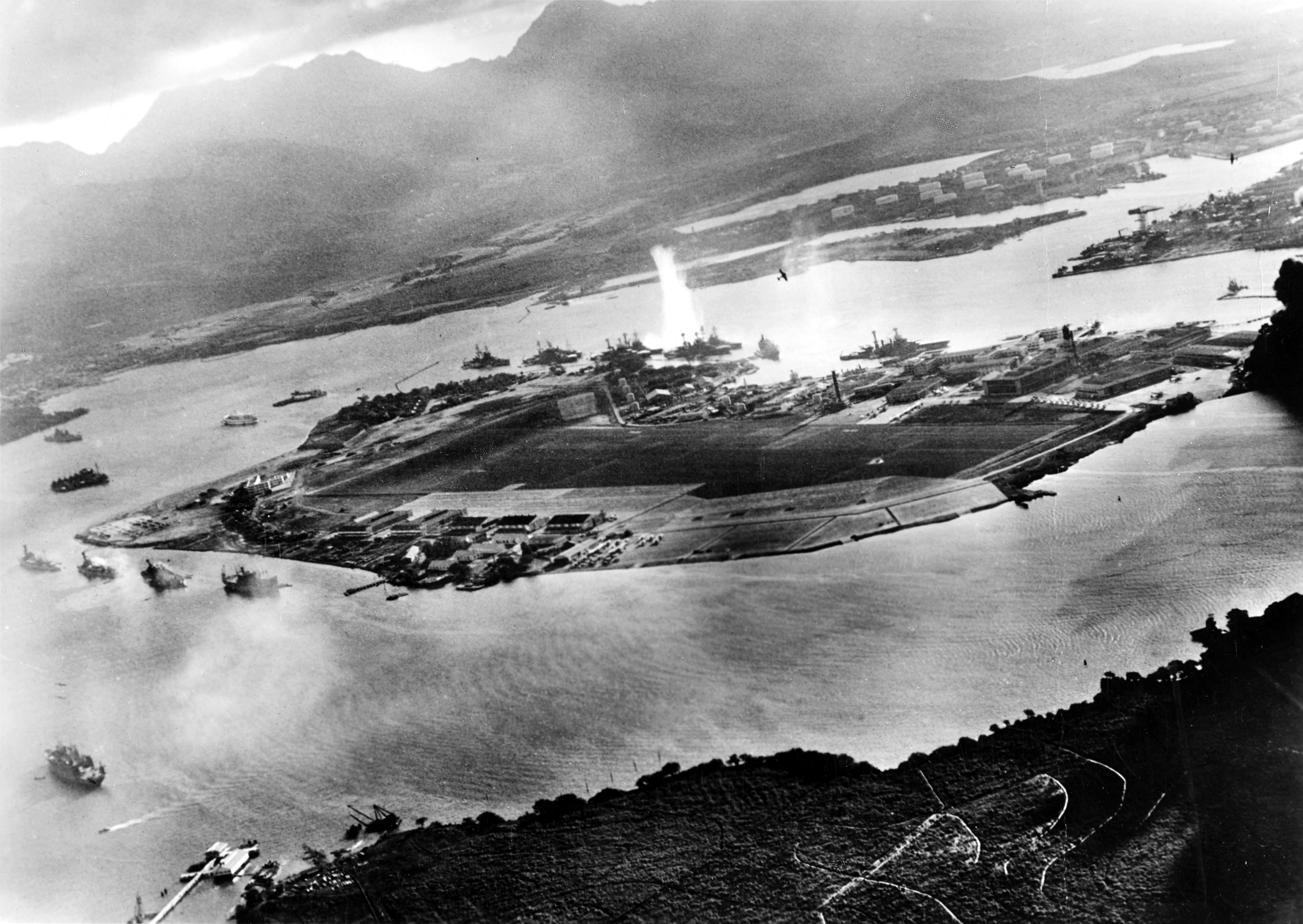
Battleship Row during the attack on Pearl Harbor; the large column of water visible in the center is one of the torpedo hits on West Virginia

==== Pearl Harbor ====
On the morning of 7 December 1941, West Virginia and the rest of the fleet were moored at Battleship Row in Pearl Harbor; West Virginia was tied alongside Tennessee. Japanese aircraft appeared over the harbor shortly before 08:00, beginning the surprise attack on the base. Torpedo bombers hit the ship with seven Type 91 torpedoes on her port side, while bombers hit her with a pair of 16 in (410 mm) armor-piercing shells that had been converted into bombs. The first bomb hit the port side and penetrated the superstructure deck, causing extensive damage to the casemates below. Secondary explosions of the ammunition stored in the casemates caused serious fires there and in the galley deck below them. The second bomb struck the rear superfiring turret roof; it penetrated but failed to explode. It nevertheless destroyed one of the guns and the OS2U Kingfisher floatplane on the catapult atop the turret. It also knocked a second aircraft down to the main deck. That Kingfisher spilled gasoline on the deck that then caught on fire.

One of the torpedoes hit aft, disabling the rudder, at least three hit below the belt armor, and at least one hit the belt, damaging seven armor plates. These torpedoes opened two large holes in the hull, from frames 43 to 52 and from 62 to 97; at least one torpedo passed through the holes after the ship began to list and exploded on the second armor deck. The torpedo hits caused extensive damage and the ship avoided capsizing only through prompt damage control efforts initiated by Lieutenant Claude V. Ricketts, then the ship's assistant fire control officer. Captain Mervyn S. Bennion was mortally wounded by bomb fragments from a hit on Tennessee; for remaining aboard the ship and assisting in its defense until he died, he received the Medal of Honor. After receiving his wounds, Bennion was carried from the bridge by crew members including mess attendant second-class Doris Miller. Shortly afterwards, Miller was ordered to man an anti-aircraft gun on the conning tower despite no training in the operation of the weapon; Miller was awarded a Navy Cross for his actions. As the ship filled with water and slowly sank on an even keel, the crew was evacuated, though a group volunteered to return to fight the fires that had broken out. Fuel oil leaking from the destroyed Arizona caught fire and engulfed West Virginia in flames, which was also fed by her own leaking fuel oil. The fires were eventually put out the next day. A total of 106 men were killed in the attack. Among them were three sailors (Ronald Endicott, Clifford Olds and Louis Costin), who survived in an airtight storeroom until 23 December, according to a calendar found by salvage crews on which sixteen days had been crossed off in red pencil. On 6 December 2019, the Department of Defense announced that eight of the thirty-five unknown remains from West Virginia had been identified.

West Virginia during and after the attack
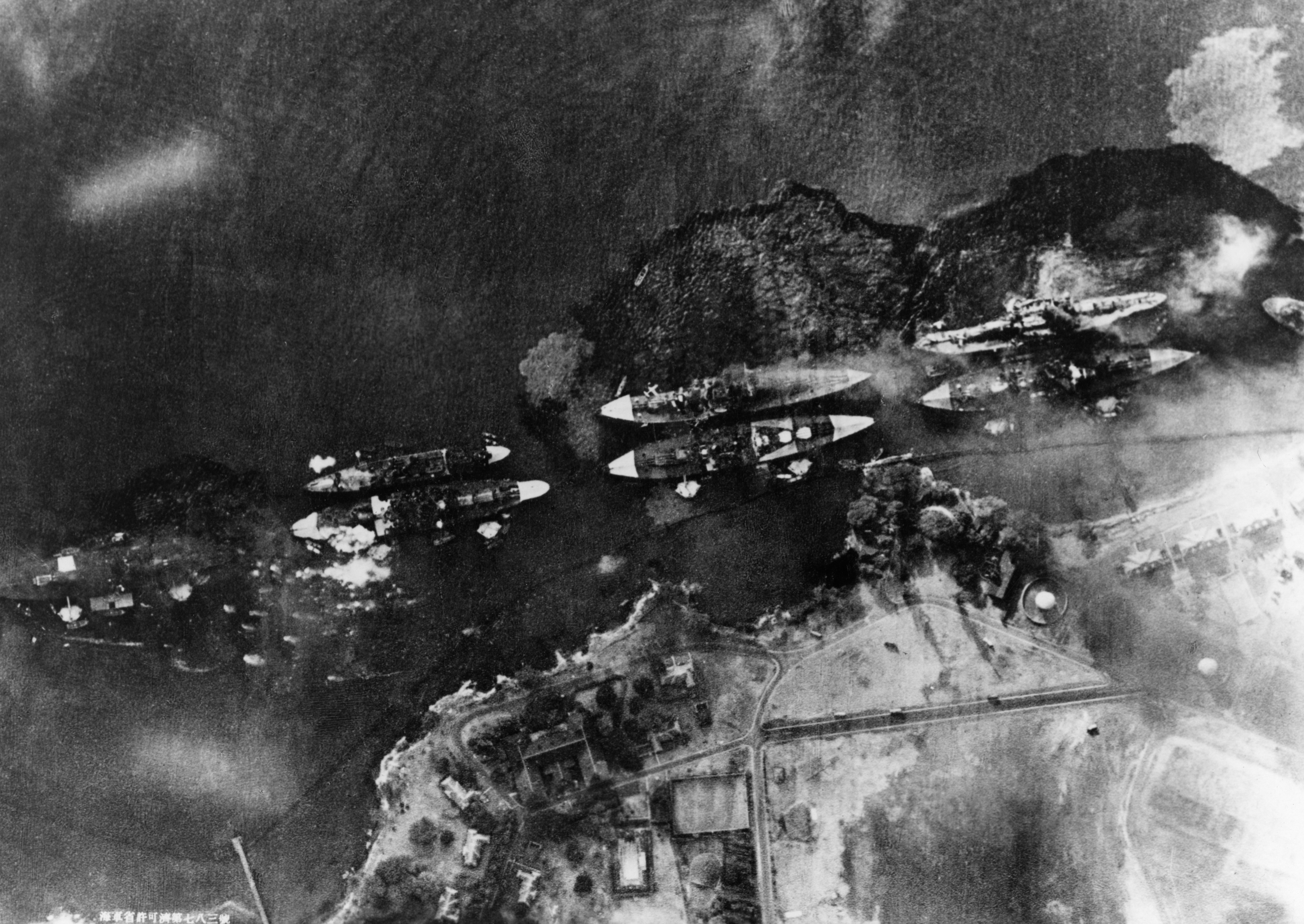
Japanese reconnaissance photo showing Battleship Row; West Virginia is leaking fuel from torpedo hits

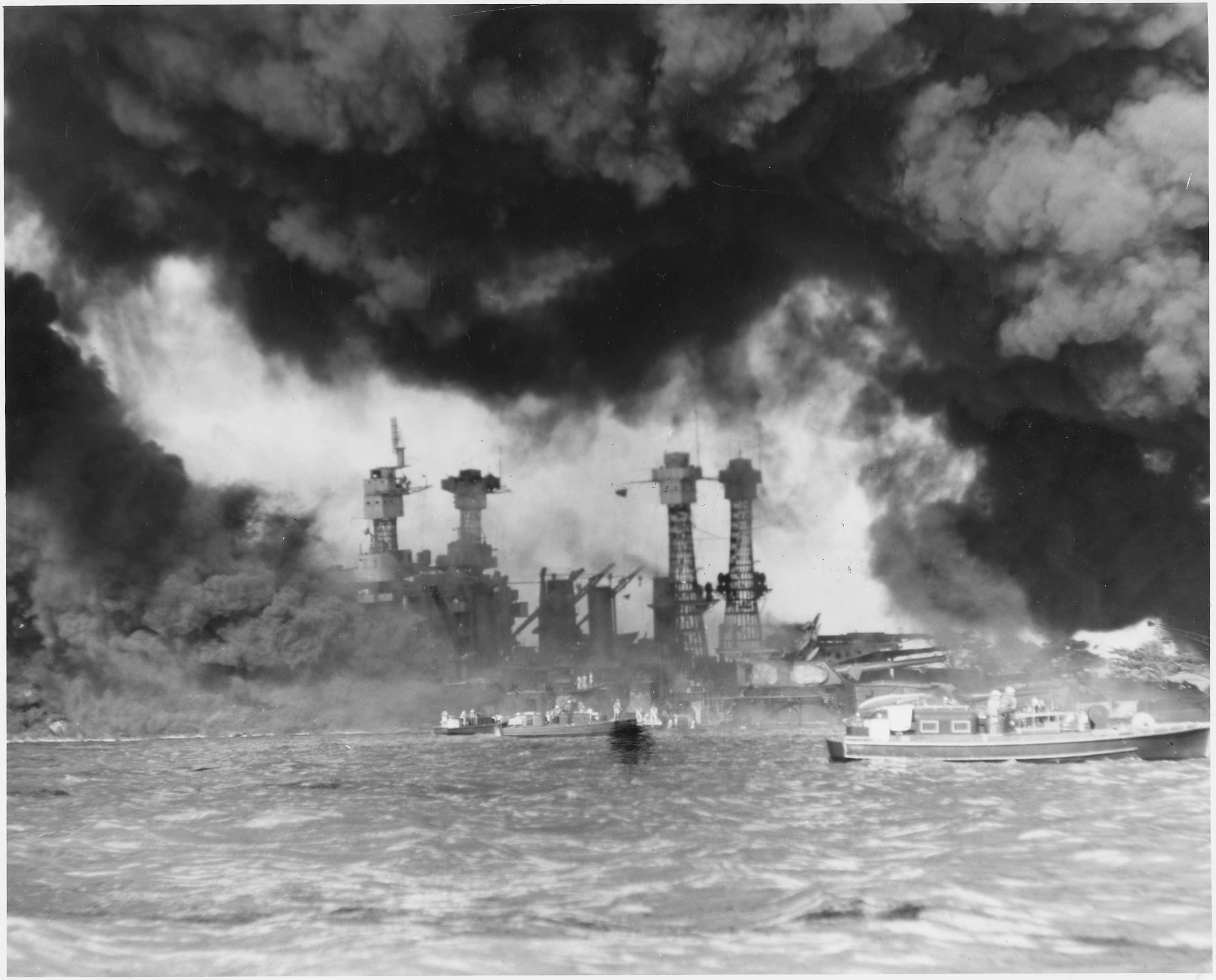
West Virginia, engulfed in flames

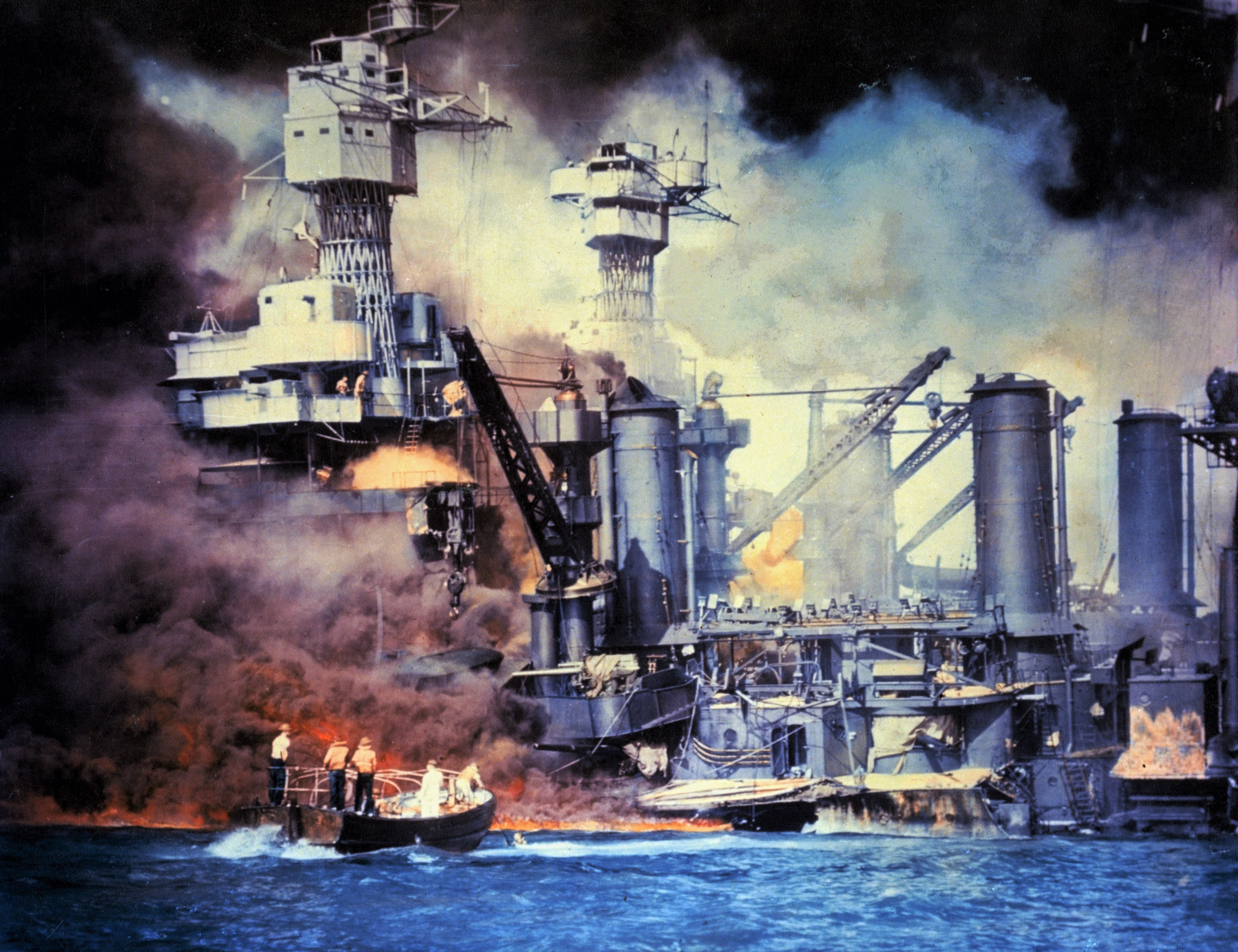
A motor launch pulls a man from the water

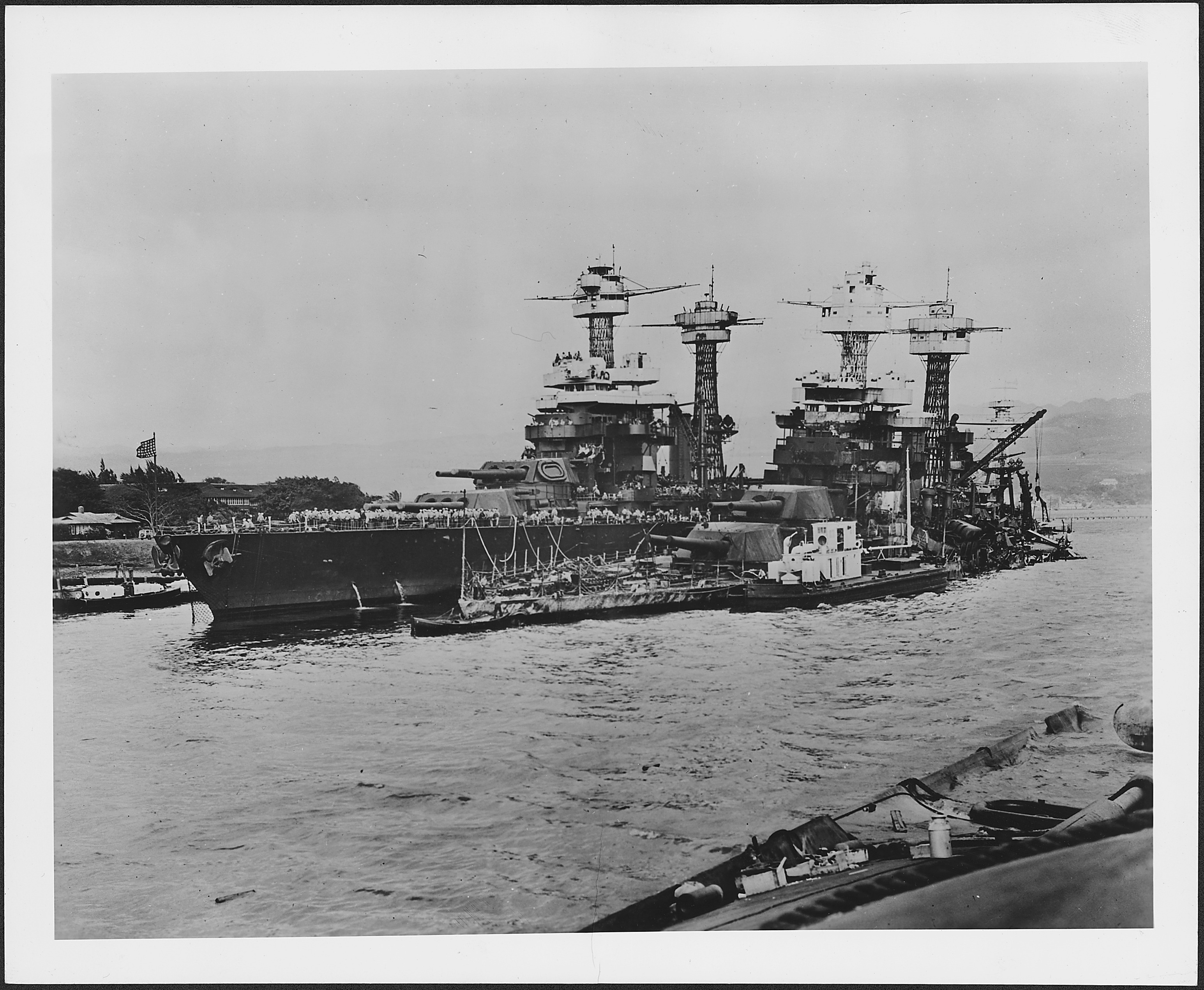
West Virginia (right) sunk alongside Tennessee after the attack

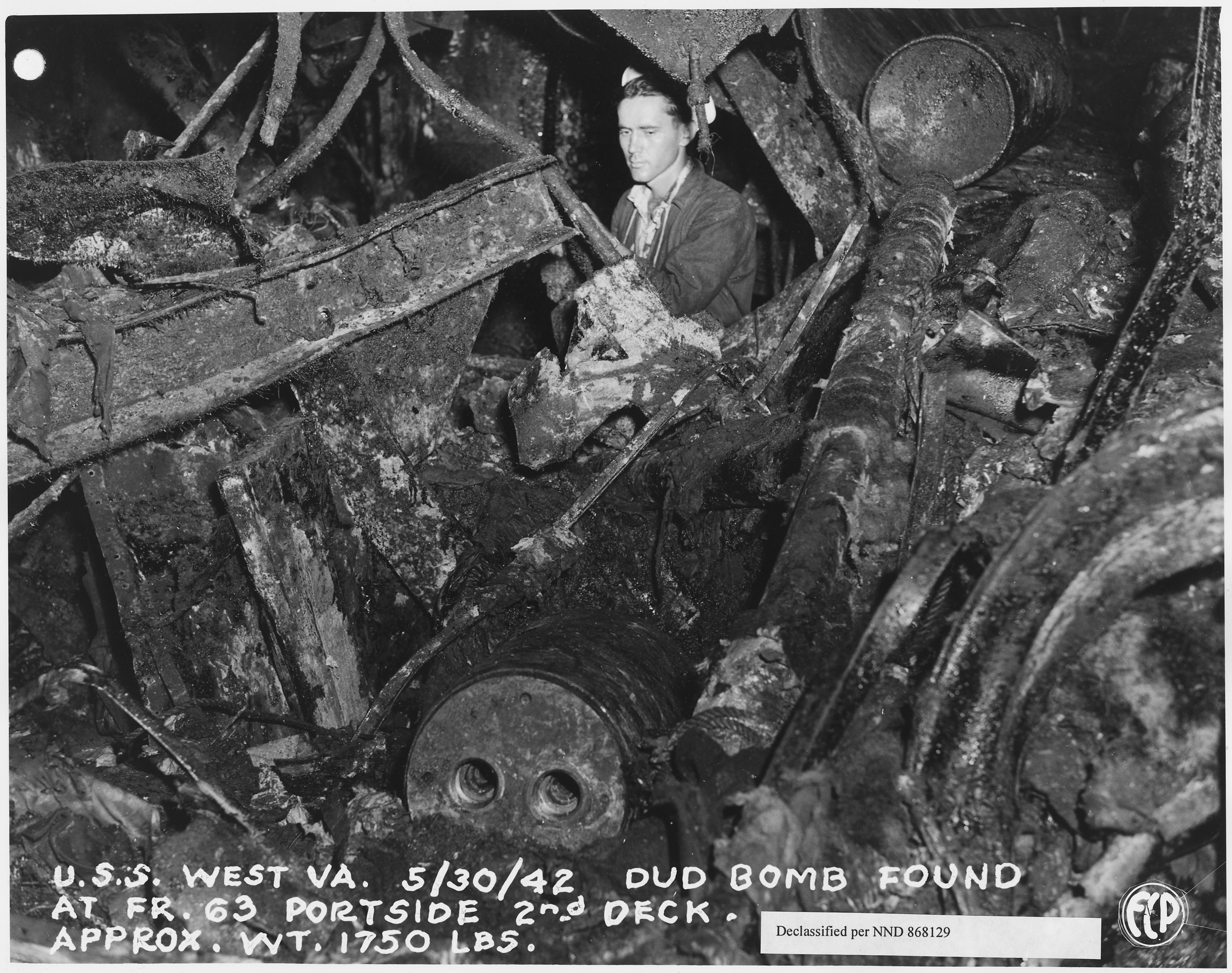
Shipyard worker inspecting interior damage in 1942

==== Repairs and modernization ====
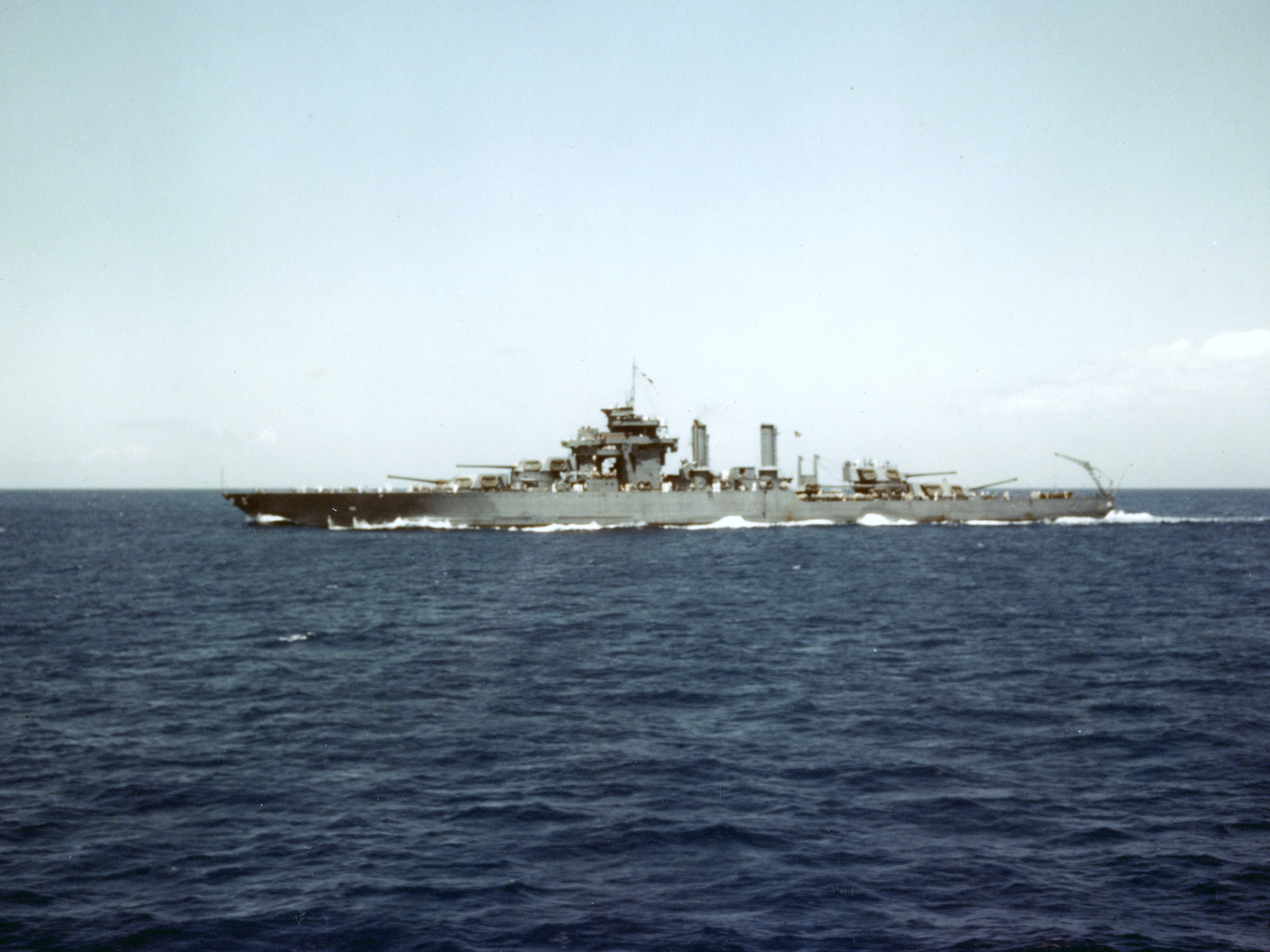
West Virginia leaving Pearl Harbor, April 30, 1943

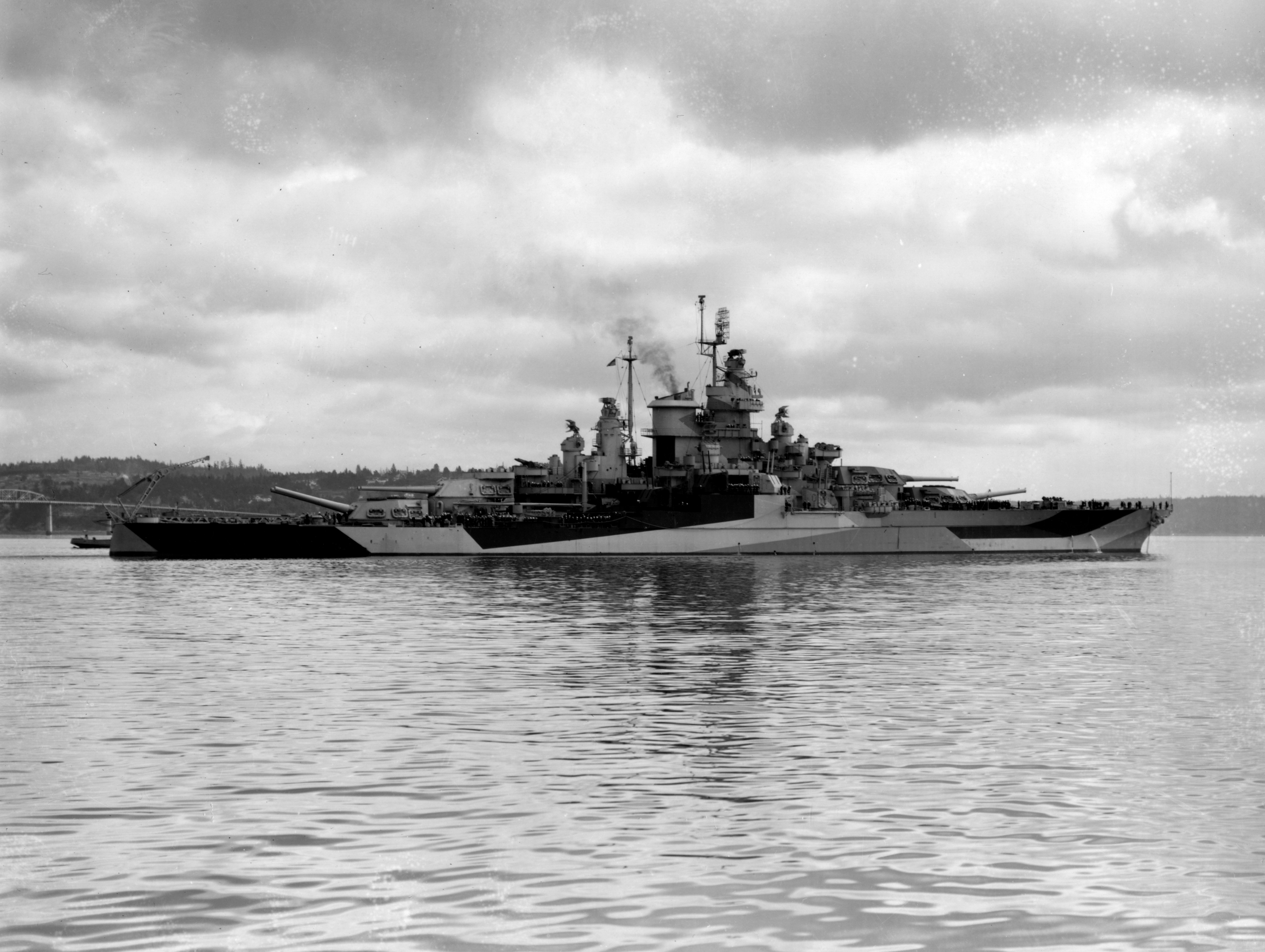
West Virginia in July 1944

Workers fixed patches over the two torpedo holes and pumped West Virginia dry, refloating her on 17 May 1942. She was then taken into Dry Dock No. 1 in Pearl Harbor on 9 June for an inspection; it had been initially believed that she had been hit by five torpedoes, but a sixth impact had been discovered during the patching, and this inspection revealed the seventh hit. The shipyard workers then began temporary repairs to make the ship seaworthy, and during this period they discovered the remains of 66 or 70 men who had been trapped below decks when she sank. Some of these had survived for several days in air bubbles with emergency rations and fresh water, but their oxygen and supplies ran out long before the ship was refloated. After completing repairs, West Virginia got underway for the Puget Sound Navy Yard in Bremerton, Washington for a thorough reconstruction.

Almost immediately after the attack, the navy began considering the extent to which the old battleships should be modernized, with proposals to replace the lattice masts with other structures that could accommodate the heavier radar equipment being fitted to the fleet's ships. Since West Virginia and California had been badly damaged in the Pearl Harbor attack and thus could not be quickly returned to service like the other battleships, they would have the bulges that had been planned before the war installed, which would offset the loss of freeboard incurred by the addition of 1,400 long tons (1,400 t) of deck armor. Plans were also made to install a battery of the dual-purpose 5-inch guns, but the work was deferred as a result of the length of time necessary to reconstruct the ship. In addition, the limited number of drydocks on the west coast slowed the pace of reconstruction, and West Virginia had to wait until Tennessee and California were rebuilt; work on West Virginia was not completed until September 1944.

Work on West Virginia saw the ship radically altered. In addition to the torpedo bulges, her superstructure was completely revised, with the old heavily armored conning tower being removed and a smaller tower erected in its place to reduce interference with the anti-aircraft guns' fields of fire. The new tower had been removed from one of the Brooklyn-class cruisers that had recently been rebuilt. The foremast was replaced with a tower mast that housed the bridge and the main battery director, and her second funnel was removed, with those boilers being trunked into an enlarged forward funnel. The ship's weapons suite was also overhauled. She received air-search radar and fire-control radars for her main and secondary batteries, the latter being replaced by a uniform battery of sixteen 5-inch/38 cal. guns in eight twin mounts. These were controlled by four Mk 37 directors. The light anti-aircraft battery was again revised, now consisting of ten quadruple 40 mm (1.6 in) Bofors guns and forty-three 20 mm Oerlikons.

By early July 1944, the ship was ready to begin sea trials in her post-refit condition. She loaded ammunition on 2 July and departed for trials off Port Townsend, Washington, with the evaluations continuing until 12 July, at which point she returned to Puget Sound for repairs. She then steamed south to San Pedro, Los Angeles for a shakedown cruise before departing for Hawaii on 14 September in company with a pair of escorting destroyers. After arriving there on 23 September, she joined Battleship Division 4 (BatDiv 4) and the carrier Hancock, all of which sailed on to Manus in the Admiralty Islands to begin preparations for the upcoming operations in the Philippines. The ships arrived in Seeadler Harbor on 5 October and the following day, West Virginia became the flagship of Rear Admiral Theodore D. Ruddock, the commander of BatDiv 4.

==== Operations in the Philippines ====
===== Leyte =====
On 12 October 1944, West Virginia and the rest of the fleet sortied to begin the invasion of the Philippines, starting with the island of Leyte. West Virginia was assigned to Task Group (TG) 77.2, the shore bombardment force for the operation that was commanded by Rear Admiral Jesse B. Oldendorf. While en route later that day, West Virginia steamed astern of California and the latter vessel's paravanes cut the anchor chain for a naval mine, forcing West Virginia to steer around it; gunfire from a nearby destroyer detonated the mine safely. The invasion fleet arrived in San Pedro Bay early on 19 October and at 07:00, West Virginia and the rest of TG 77.2 moved into their bombardment positions. They opened fire on targets around Tacloban, shelling Japanese positions and providing covering fire for the Underwater Demolition Teams that were preparing the invasion beaches for much of the day before withdrawing that evening. In the course of the day's bombardment, she fired a total of 278 shells from her main battery and 1,586 rounds from her secondary guns.

The next morning, ground forces from Sixth Army went ashore and West Virginia remained on station throughout the day to provide naval gunfire support. The fleet came under Japanese air attack, though the ship's anti-aircraft gunners were not able to shoot any aircraft down. On 21 October, while moving into her bombardment station, she lightly grounded, damaging three of her propellers. The damaged blades caused vibration that limited her speed to 16 knots (30 km/h; 18 mph) (or 18 kn (33 km/h; 21 mph) in emergencies). She nevertheless remained on station for the next two days to support the invasion as the soldiers fought their way inland, providing fire support and anti-aircraft defense as the fleet continued to be attacked by Japanese aircraft. Each night she and the rest of TG 77.2 withdrew from the beaches.

===== Battle of Leyte Gulf =====
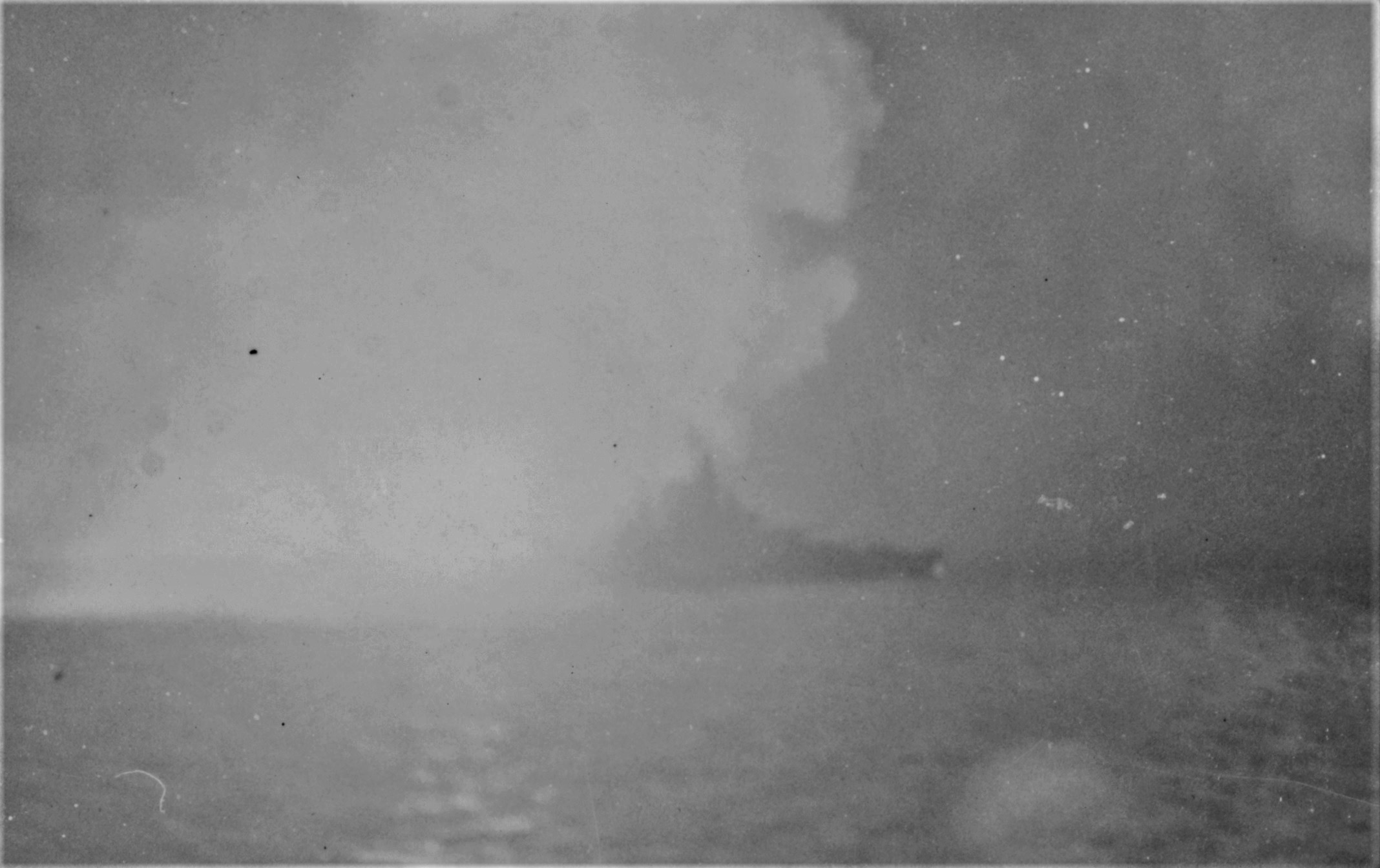
West Virginia firing in the darkness in the Surigao Strait

The landing on Leyte led to the activation of Operation Shō-Gō 1, the Japanese navy's planned riposte to an Allied landing in the Philippines. The plan was a complicated operation with three separate fleets: the Northern Force under Vice Admiral Jisaburō Ozawa, the Center Force under Vice Admiral Takeo Kurita, and the Southern Force under Vice Admiral Shōji Nishimura. Ozawa's carriers, by now depleted of most of their aircraft, were to serve as a decoy for Kurita's and Nishimura's battleships, which were to use the distraction to attack the invasion fleet directly. Kurita's ships were detected in the Palawan Passage on 24 October 1944, and in the ensuing Battle of the Sibuyan Sea, American carrier aircraft sank the powerful battleship Musashi, causing Kurita to temporarily reverse course. This convinced Admiral William F. Halsey, the commander of Third Fleet, to send the fast carrier task force to destroy the Northern Force, which had by then been detected. While these maneuvers were occurring, Nishumura's force approached the Surigao Strait to attack the invasion fleet from the south. His fleet consisted of the battleships Yamashiro and Fusō, the heavy cruiser Mogami, and four destroyers, supplemented by Vice Admiral Kiyohide Shima's Second Striking Force, consisting of the heavy cruisers Nachi and Ashigara, the light cruiser Abukuma, and four more destroyers.

As Nishimura's flotilla passed through the strait on the night of 24 October, they came under attack from American PT boats, followed by destroyers, initiating the Battle of Surigao Strait. One of these US destroyers torpedoed Fusō and disabled her, though Nishimura continued on toward his objective. West Virginia steamed at the head of the American line. Observers aboard Tennessee spotted the flashes in the distance as the light American craft attacked Nishimura's force, and at 03:02, her search radar picked up the enemy ships at a range of 44,000 yd (40,000 m). West Virginia's radar picked them up fourteen minutes later, by which time the range had fallen to 42,000 yd (38,000 m). Oldendorf gave the order to open fire at 03:51, and West Virginia opened fire first a minute later, followed by Tennessee and California, concentrating their fire on Yamashiro; the other American battleships had trouble locating a target with their older, less-effective radars and held their fire. West Virginia probably hit Yamashiro on her bridge with her first salvo, though Nishimura and his staff were not injured at that time. Yamashiro was quickly hit several times by several American vessels that concentrated their fire on her. With Yamashiro badly damaged and burning furiously, the Americans then shifted fire to Mogami, which was also hit several times, suffering severe damage.

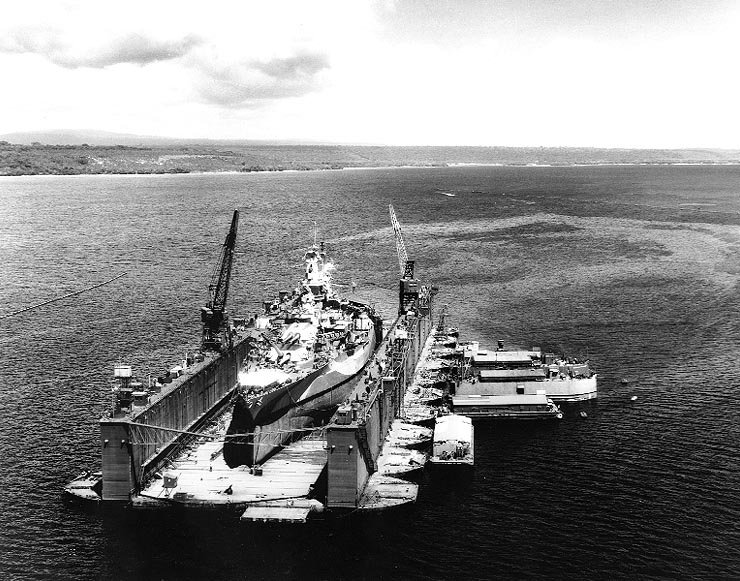
West Virginia aboard the floating drydock USS Artisan for repairs on 13 November 1944

At about 04:00, Mogami and then Yamashiro turned to retreat, both burning; the destroyer Shigure fled with them, though she had not suffered any serious damage. Shortly thereafter, Oldendorf ordered his battleships to make a 150-degree turn, and West Virginia complied at 04:02, leading the other battleships on the new course, which ran parallel to Yamashiro's line of retreat. Confusion aboard California led her to fall out of position, and in so doing, mask the rest of the battleships and force them to cease firing to avoid hitting her. Shortly thereafter, reports of Japanese torpedoes in the water prompted the American battleships to turn to the north at 04:18 to avoid them. This marked the end of the action, as the remaining Japanese ships retreated in the darkness. In the course of the action, West Virginia fired sixteen salvos at the Japanese ships; this proved to be the last ever battle between battleships.

===== Later operations =====
On 29 October 1944, West Virginia, Tennessee, and the battleship Maryland got underway, headed to the navy's advance base at Ulithi. From there, West Virginia proceeded on to Espiritu Santo for repairs to her damaged propellers; Ruddock shifted his flag to Maryland during this period. On arriving, she entered the floating drydock Artisan for maintenance before returning to the Philippines in November. Steaming first to Manus and then to Leyte Gulf, she arrived on 25 November and resumed patrols in the area to defend the fleet from air attacks. On 27 November, the fleet came under another attack and at 11:39, her gunners shot down a kamikaze suicide aircraft. During further attacks the next day, she assisted in the destruction of several other kamikazes. Ruddock returned to the ship on 30 November, and the battleship remained in the area until 2 December, when she departed for the Palau Islands for replenishment. There, she became the flagship of TG 77.12, the bombardment group for the next landing in the Philippines.

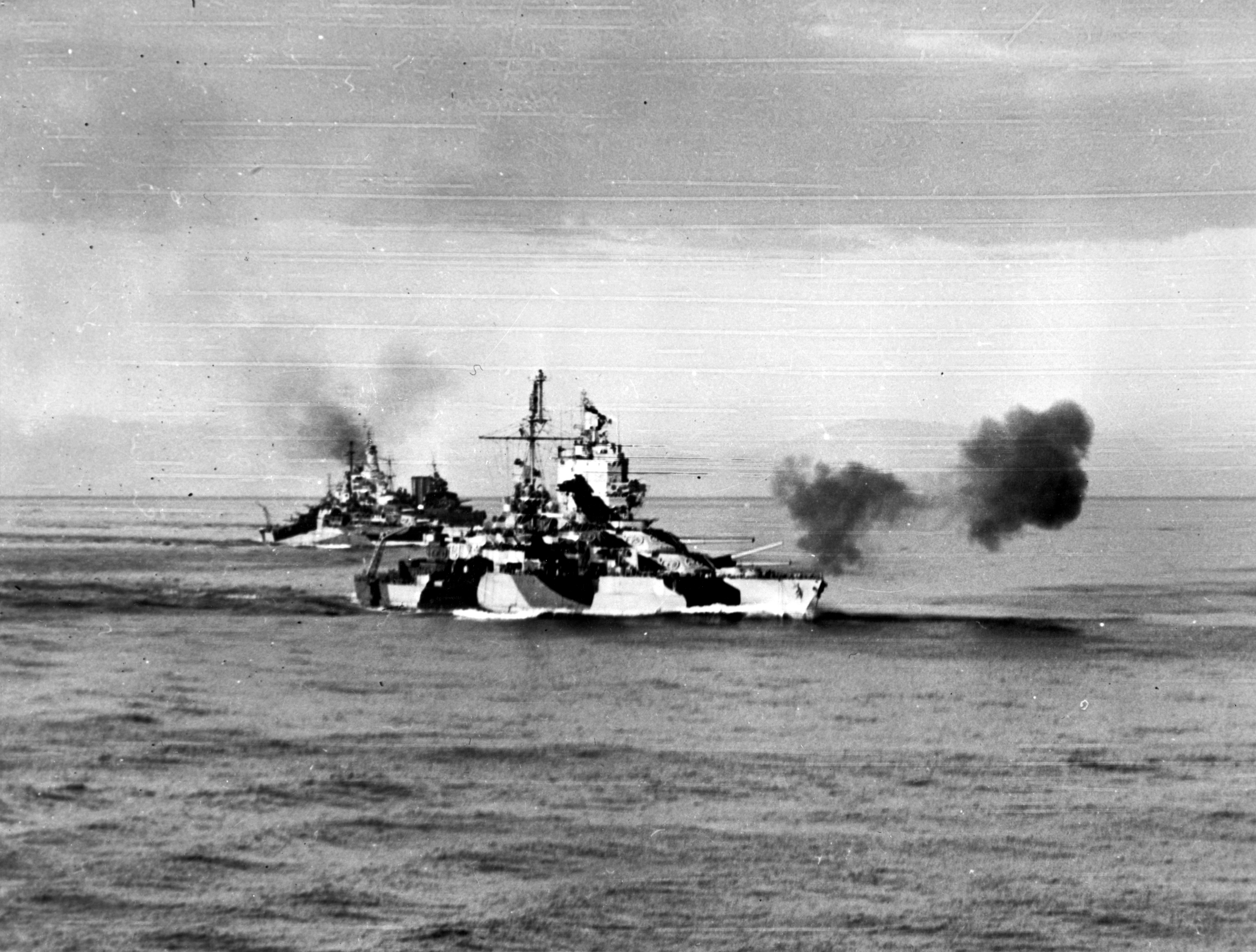
West Virginia astern of Mississippi firing in Lingayen Gulf on 8 January

The fleet passed through Leyte Gulf on 12 December, turning south through Surigao Strait the next day and entering the Sulu Sea for the assault on Mindoro in company with TG 78.3, the invasion transport force. After landing ground forces, the transports withdrew on 15 December and West Virginia was tasked with covering their departure. West Virginia refueled in Leyte Gulf and then continued on to the Kossol Roads in the Palaus, arriving on 19 December. She remained there for the rest of the year, and on 1 January 1945, Rear Admiral Ingram C. Sowell replaced Ruddock as the commander of BatDiv 4. That same day, she sortied as part of TG 77.2. After entering Leyte Gulf on 3 January, the ships steamed into the Sulu Sea, where they came under heavy Japanese air attack the next day; the escort carrier Ommaney Bay was badly damaged by kamikazes and was then scuttled; nearby destroyers took off the crew, some of whom were then transferred to West Virginia.

On 5 January, the fleet entered the South China Sea and then turned north toward Lingayen Gulf; further Japanese air attacks took place throughout the day and West Virginia contributed her guns to the fleet's defense. While on the way, the ship closed with San Fernando Point and bombarded Japanese positions in the area. Waves of kamikazes struck the fleet and hit several ships but West Virginia avoided them. The next day, the minesweeper Hovey was sunk by a Japanese torpedo and West Virginia took on survivors from the vessel. Over the course of 8–9 January, the ship bombarded the town of San Fabian in Lingayen Gulf to prepare for the invasion that took place later on the 9th. That evening, the survivors from Ommaney Bay and Hovey departed West Virginia.

The ship continued her fire support mission on 10 January and then spent the next week patrolling Lingayen Gulf to protect the beachhead. During this period, she was called on to neutralize defensive positions, destroy ammunition dumps, and shell rail and road junctions to disrupt the Japanese ability to reinforce their positions. Heavy bombardment from West Virginia and the other ships flattened San Fabian. Over the course of the bombardment, she fired 395 main battery shells and more than 2,800 secondary shells. On 21 January, the ship departed at 07:07 to support ground forces fighting in the towns of Rosario and Santo Tomas to the north of Lingayen Gulf, opening fire at 08:15. She remained there for several days, providing fire support, before returning to Lingayen Gulf on 1 February. The ships of TG 77.2 thereafter covered transports carrying supplies for the Army as they arrived to unload their cargo at the beachhead. On 10 February, West Virginia departed for Leyte Gulf.

==== Battle of Iwo Jima ====
West Virginia passed through San Pedro Bay in Leyte Gulf before proceeding on to Ulithi, which she reached on 16 February 1945. There she joined Fifth Fleet and she immediately began preparations for the attack on Iwo Jima. She refueled and replenished supplies for the upcoming operation and was ready to depart at 04:00 the next morning; the ship got underway three and a half hours later, escorted by the destroyers Izard and McCall. On arriving off the island on 19 February, she joined Task Force (TF) 51, and at 11:25 she received orders to join the bombardment already underway as ground forces landed on the beach. She moved to her assigned station at 11:45 and opened fire an hour later; the marines fighting ashore directed her fire to target blockhouses, machine gun positions, tanks, and other Japanese positions.

The ship withdrew for the evening and returned two days later on 21 February, opening fire at 08:00 and remaining on station all day. During the bombardment, she hit an ammunition or fuel dump, setting off large, repeated explosions for the next two hours. She was hit by a small artillery shell the next day that struck near the forward superfiring turret and wounded one sailor. The ship remained off the island for the rest of the month as the marines fought to secure Iwo Jima from the tenacious Japanese defenders. On 27 February, she neutralized an artillery battery that had been firing on the destroyer Bryant. The battleship left the following day to replenish ammunition before returning later that day to resume the bombardment. She shelled targets throughout the night to harass the Japanese troops and interdict their movements. West Virginia continued to shell the island for the next three days before departing for Ulithi on 4 March; she arrived there two days later.

==== Battle of Okinawa ====
West Virginia then joined Task Force 54 (TF 54) for the next major amphibious assault in the Ryukyu Islands; the ships departed on 21 March 1945 and arrived off the island of Okinawa on 25 March. West Virginia moved to her assigned bombardment station and began to shell the planned landing zones. At 10:29 on 26 March, a single Japanese shell fell some 5,000 yd (4,600 m) off West Virginia's port bow; she fired twenty-eight 16-inch shells in response. Intense Japanese air counterattacks began the next morning, and she shot down a Yokosuka P1Y twin-engined bomber that day. The ship remained off the island for the next few days, bombarding the landing beaches to prepare for the assault that was scheduled for 1 April. Before the attack began, the ship withdrew to replenish ammunition at Kerama Retto, which had been seized at the start of the campaign to provide an advance base for the invasion fleet.

The ship returned to the island early on 1 April to support the landings; while approaching Okinawa at 04:45, she had to reverse her engines to avoid colliding with a destroyer that inadvertently crossed her bow in the darkness. As she continued to steam to her assigned station, her anti-aircraft gunners spotted an enemy aircraft, which they shot down; shortly thereafter, a group of four more hostile aircraft appeared, one of which West Virginia's guns destroyed. By 06:30, the ship had reached her station just 900 yd (820 m) from shore and began shelling the beach as the landing craft slowly made their way to the landing zone. The ship remained off the island throughout the day, though ground forces initially encountered little resistance and West Virginia's guns were not immediately needed. That evening, however, a wave of kamikazes arrived and at 19:03, one of them crashed into West Virginia. The plane struck the ship's superstructure just forward of the No. 2 director for the secondary battery. The resulting explosion killed four and wounded seven in one of the 20 mm gun batteries. The aircraft had been carrying a bomb that penetrated to the second deck, though it failed to detonate; it was later defused by the ship's bomb disposal officer.

West Virginia nevertheless remained off the island through the night, firing star shells to illuminate marine positions to help repel Japanese infiltration attacks. The next day, the dead were buried at sea and the ship returned to bombardment duty shortly thereafter. On 6 April, her gunners shot down an Aichi D3A dive bomber. The next day, the Japanese Navy launched a last strike with a small squadron centered on the battleship Yamato, and West Virginia was sent to patrol to the west of the island to intercept any Japanese vessels that broke through heavy American air attacks. On 8 April, the ship received word that most of the Japanese vessels had been sunk or fled. West Virginia resumed bombardment operations and air defense of the fleet. She remained on station until 20 April, when she got underway for Ulithi; she did not reach her destination, however, as she was quickly recalled to replace her sister Colorado after the latter suffered an accidental explosion while replenishing ammunition. West Virginia briefly returned to Okinawa, operating off Hagushi Beach in support of XXIV Corps. She was then relieved and sailed to Ulithi with the heavy cruiser San Francisco and the destroyer Hobson, arriving there on 28 April.

The ship then returned to Okinawa to resume fire support duties, which she carried out through June. During this period, on 1 and 2 June, she destroyed a Japanese blockhouse that had held up the American advance during a series of bombardments. On 16 June, having moved south to support the 1st Marine Regiment, one of the ship's Kingfishers was shot down by Japanese fire. The pilot and observer both bailed out from the aircraft, but they fell behind Japanese lines and were pinned down. West Virginia, the destroyer Putnam, and a Landing Craft, Infantry attempted to suppress the Japanese defenses in the area so ground forces could break through and rescue the downed air crew, but the effort failed and the men were killed. The ship received another Kingfisher from Tennessee, allowing her to continue to support the forces ashore through the end of the month.

==== End of the war ====
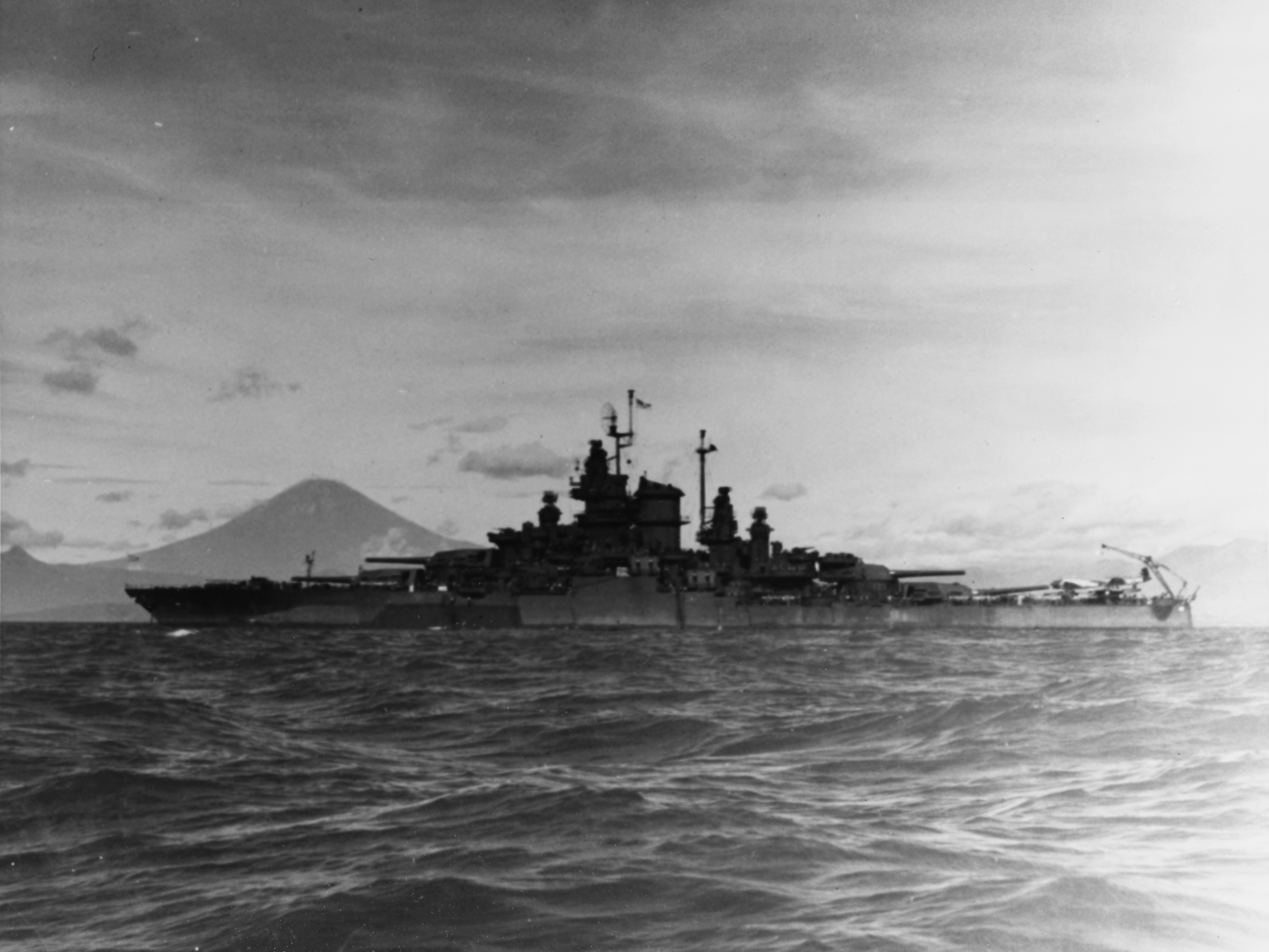
West Virginia anchored in Sagami Bay in August 1945

At the end of June 1945, the ship left Okinawan waters for San Pedro Bay in company with the destroyer escort Connolly, arriving there on 1 July. Four days later, she received a group of replacement crewmen, and after loading ammunition there, began training in preparation for the expected invasion of Kyushu, the invasion of the Japanese mainland. These operations continued through July, and on 3 August she got underway for Okinawa, arriving in Buckner Bay on 6 August. That day, the first atomic bomb was dropped on Hiroshima, and a second was dropped on Nagasaki three days later. After these two attacks, rumors spread on 10 August that the Japanese would surrender, prompting celebrations among the crews of the ships in Okinawa, though two days later the battleship Pennsylvania was torpedoed by a Japanese submarine. West Virginia sent a whaleboat with pumps to assist the damaged battleship.

On 15 August, the Japanese surrendered, and West Virginia's contingent of marines began preparations for the occupation of Japan. The ship departed on 24 August, headed for Tokyo Bay, assigned to TG 35.90, arriving there on 31 August. She was present during the formal surrender ceremonies aboard the battleship Missouri on 2 September, and West Virginia loaned five musicians from the ship's band to play during the ceremony. West Virginia remained in Tokyo for the next two weeks to assist with the initial occupation effort, and on 14 September she took on a group of 270 passengers to be carried back to the United States. The ship got underway on 20 September with TG 30.4 for Okinawa; after a stop in Buckner Bay on 23 September, she continued on to Pearl Harbor, arriving there on 4 October. There, her crew repainted the ship before departing on 9 October for San Diego, California, which she reached on 22 October. Sowell left the ship two days later.

In the course of the war, West Virginia was awarded five battle stars, despite having missed much of the war due to the severe damage suffered at Pearl Harbor.

=== Postwar ===
During the Navy Day celebrations on 27 October 1945, some 25,554 people visited the ship. Three days later, she departed for Pearl Harbor to begin her role in Operation Magic Carpet, the repatriation effort to return American servicemen from the Pacific. She took on passengers in Pearl Harbor and carried them back to San Diego, making three runs through the end of the year, the last arriving in San Diego on 17 December. She remained in port until 4 January 1946, when she departed for Bremerton, arriving there on 12 January, where she was taken to be deactivated. She was moved to Seattle, Washington, four days later and tied up alongside Colorado. Further work to prepare her for the reserve fleet continued into February and she was formally decommissioned on 9 January 1947, assigned to the Pacific Reserve Fleet. West Virginia remained in the navy's inventory until 1 March 1959, when she was struck from the Naval Vessel Register and placed for sale; she was sold on 24 August to the Union Minerals & Alloys Corp. and towed to Todd-Pacific Shipyard in Seattle on 3 January 1961 to be broken up.

Several parts of the ship are preserved in locations throughout the United States, primarily in West Virginia. One of her anti-aircraft guns is on display in City Park in Parkersburg, West Virginia, two of her 5 inch guns are on display at Illahee State Park in Bremerton, Washington, and the ship's wheel and binnacle are on display at the Hampton Roads Naval Museum. When the ship was sold for scrap, students at West Virginia University helped raise funds to preserve the ship's mast, which is housed on the campus. The ship's bell is on display at the West Virginia State Museum in Charleston. In 2000, governor Cecil Underwood issued a proclamation on the 59th anniversary of the Pearl Harbor attack naming Interstate 470 in West Virginia the USS West Virginia Memorial Highway.
