= USS Maryland (BB-46) =

Dreadnought battleship of the United States Navy

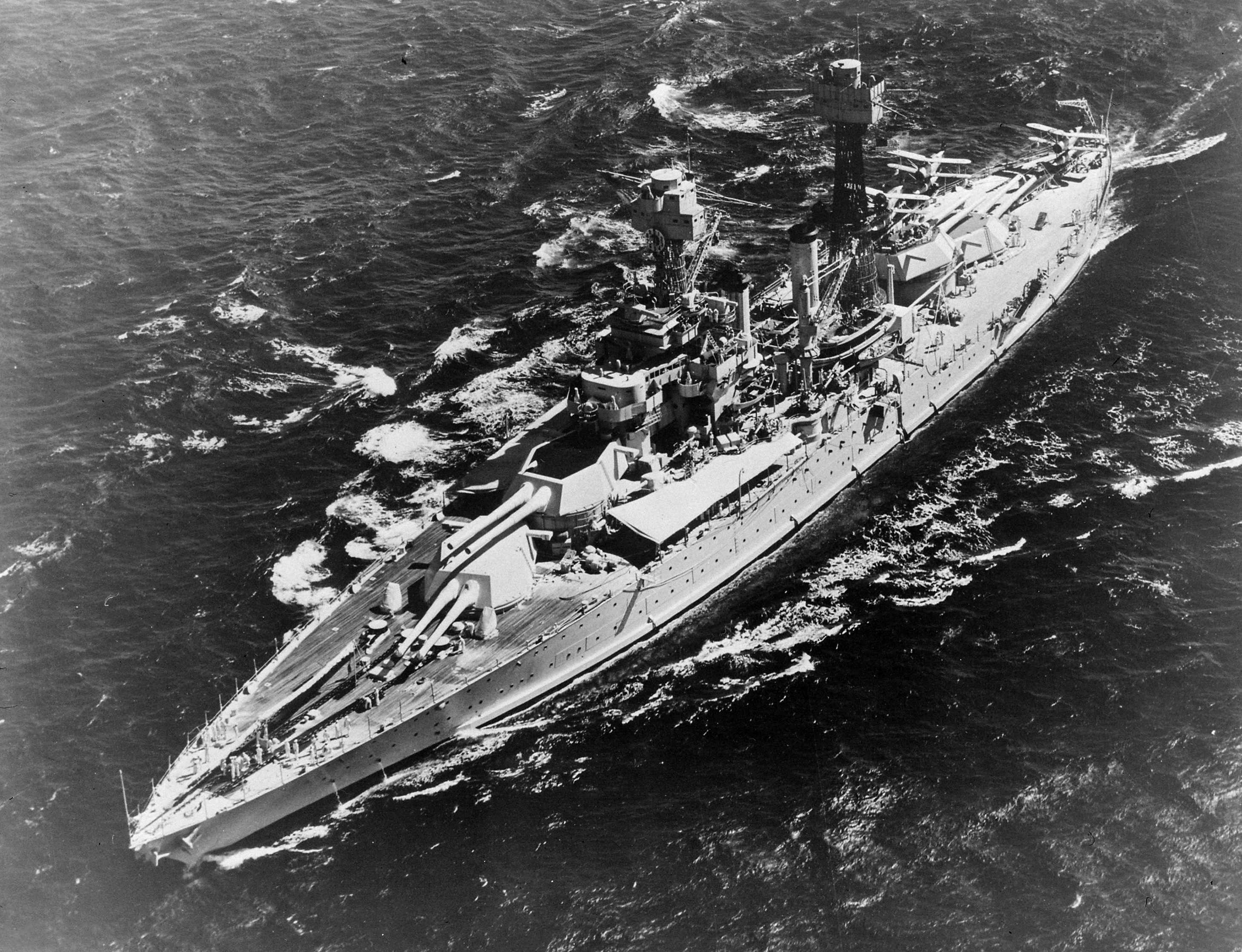
- USS Maryland (BB-46) underway in 1935

History

United States
- Name: Maryland
- Namesake: Maryland
- Ordered: 5 December 1916
- Builder: Newport News Shipbuilding
- Laid down: 24 April 1917
- Launched: 20 March 1920
- Commissioned: 21 July 1921
- Decommissioned: 3 April 1947
- Fate: Sold for scrap, 8 July 1959

General characteristics
- Class & type: Colorado-class battleship
- Displacement: 32,600 long tons (33,100 t)
- Length: 624 ft (190 m)
- Beam: 97 ft 6 in (29.72 m)
- Draft: 30 ft 6 in (9.30 m)
- Speed: 21.17 kn (39.21 km/h; 24.36 mph)
- Complement: 1,080 officers and enlisted
- Armament: As built: 8 × 16 in (406 mm)/45 caliber guns; 12 × 5 in (127 mm)/51 caliber guns; 4 × 3 in (76 mm)/23 caliber guns; 2 × 21 in (533 mm) torpedo tubes; 1945 configuration: 8 × 16 in (406 mm)/45 caliber guns; 8 × twin 5"/38 caliber guns; 40 or 44 (Note: Sources conflict on the number of Bofors guns fitted during the 1945 refit. McDonald, p. 210, cites 40 guns while Sturton, p. 217, cites 44 guns.) × 40 mm Bofors gun; 36 or 44 (Note: Sources also conflict on the number of Oerlikon cannons fitted during the 1945 refit. McDonald, p. 210, cites 36 guns while Sturton, p. 217, cites 44 guns.) × 20 mm Oerlikon cannon
- Armor: Belt: 8–13.5 in (200–340 mm); Barbettes: 13 in (330 mm); Turret face: 18 in (460 mm); Turret sides: 9–10 in (230–250 mm); Turret top: 5 in (130 mm); Turret rear 9 in (230 mm); Conning tower: 11.5 in (290 mm); Decks: 3.5 in (89 mm)
- Aircraft carried: 4 × floatplanes
- Aviation facilities: 2 × aircraft catapults

USS Maryland, hull number BB-46, also known as "Old Mary" or "Fighting Mary" to her crewmates, was a Colorado-class battleship. She was the third ship of the United States Navy to be named in honor of the seventh state. She was commissioned in 1921, and serving as the flagship of the fleet, cruised to Australia, New Zealand, and Brazil.

During World War II, she was on Battleship Row during the Attack on Pearl Harbor, and was lightly damaged by Japanese bombs. Returning to duty in 1942, she saw service in the Pacific War, first supporting the rest of the fleet at the Battle of Midway, and then patrolling the Fiji Islands to guard against Japanese incursion. Next, she went on the offensive, commencing shore bombardments in the Battle of Tarawa and later in the Battle of Kwajalein. During the Battle of Saipan she took torpedo damage to her bow, necessitating repairs and refits. She then participated in the Battle of Leyte Gulf where she was hit by a kamikaze. She took another kamikaze hit at the Battle of Okinawa, then completed repairs and upgrades at Bremerton, WA. She was sailing back to the Pacific Theater when word was received that the war had ended, so she turned around and returned to the Port of Long Beach, CA.

After service in Operation Magic Carpet, she was decommissioned in 1947, and sold for scrap in 1959. She received seven battle stars for World War II service.

== Design ==
In 1916, design work was completed on the next class of battleships to be built for the United States Navy beginning in 1917. These ships were nearly direct copies of the preceding Tennessee class, with the exception of the main battery, which increased from twelve 14-inch (356 mm) guns to eight 16 in (406 mm) guns. The Colorado class proved to be the last class of battleships completed of the standard type.

Maryland was 624 ft (190 m) long overall and she had a beam of 97 ft 6 in (29.72 m) and a draft of 30 ft 6 in (9.30 m). She displaced 32,693 long tons (33,218 t) as designed and up to 33,590 long tons (34,130 t) at full load. The ship was powered by four General Electric turbo-electric drives with steam provided by eight oil-fired Babcock & Wilcox boilers. The ship's propulsion system was rated at 28,900 shaft horsepower (21,600 kW) for a top speed of 21 knots (39 km/h; 24 mph), though on speed trials she reached 31,268 shp (23,317 kW) and a speed of 21.09 kn (39.06 km/h; 24.27 mph). She had a normal cruising range of 8,000 nmi (15,000 km; 9,200 mi) at 10 kn (19 km/h; 12 mph), but additional fuel space could be used in wartime to increase her range to 21,100 nmi (39,100 km; 24,300 mi) at that speed. Her crew numbered 64 officers and 1,241 enlisted men.

She was armed with a main battery of eight 16 in /45 caliber Mark 1 guns in four twin-gun turrets on the centerline, (Note: /45 caliber refers to the length of the gun in terms of caliber. The length of a /45 caliber gun is 45 times its bore diameter.) two forward and two aft in superfiring pairs. The secondary battery consisted of sixteen 5-inch (127 mm)/51 caliber guns, mounted individually in casemates clustered in the superstructure amidships. She carried an anti-aircraft battery of eight 3-inch (76 mm)/50 caliber guns in individual high-angle mounts. As was customary for capital ships of the period, she had a 21 in (533 mm) torpedo tube mounted in her hull below the waterline on each broadside. Maryland's main armored belt was 8–13.5 in (203–343 mm) thick, while the main armored deck was up to 3.5 in (89 mm) thick. The main battery gun turrets had 18 in (457 mm) thick faces on 13 in (330 mm) barbettes. Her conning tower had 16 in (406 mm) thick sides.

== Service history ==
=== Inter-war period ===
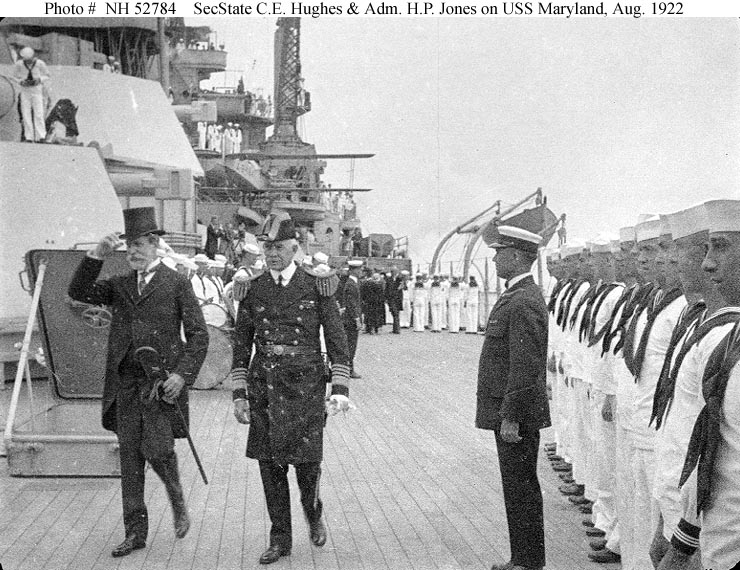
Secretary of State Charles Evans Hughes (at left) and Admiral Hilary P. Jones, Commander in Chief, U.S. Atlantic Fleet on board Maryland in August 1922

Maryland was one of four dreadnought battleships of the Colorado class to be constructed. Her keel was laid down on 24 April 1917, by Newport News Shipbuilding Company of Newport News, Virginia. She was launched on 20 March 1920, and she was commissioned on 21 July 1921. She was the third ship named for the state of Maryland. The first Maryland was a sloop commissioned in 1799 and the second Maryland was an armored cruiser commissioned in 1905.

Following her commissioning, Maryland undertook an East Coast shakedown cruise. Shortly thereafter, Maryland was made flagship of Admiral Hilary P. Jones. Maryland found herself in great demand for special occasions. She appeared at Annapolis, Maryland, for the 1922 United States Naval Academy graduation and at Boston, Massachusetts, for the anniversary of the battle of Bunker Hill and the Fourth of July. From 18 August to 25 September, she paid her first visit to a foreign port transporting Secretary of State Charles Evans Hughes to Rio de Janeiro for Brazil's Centennial Exposition. The next year, after fleet exercises off the Panama Canal Zone, Maryland transited the canal in the latter part of June to join the battle fleet stationed on the west coast. She continued to be a flagship until 1923 when the flag was shifted to Pennsylvania.

She made another voyage to a foreign port in 1925, this time to Australia and New Zealand. Several years later, in 1928, she transported President-elect Herbert Hoover on the Pacific leg of his tour of Latin America. She was overhauled in 1928–1929, and the eight 3-inch anti-aircraft guns were replaced by eight 5-inch/25 cal guns. Throughout these years and the 1930s, she served as a mainstay of fleet readiness through tireless training operations. She conducted numerous patrols in the 1930s. In 1940, Maryland and the other battleships of the battle force changed their bases of operations to Pearl Harbor. She was present at Battleship Row along Ford Island during the Japanese attack on 7 December 1941.

=== Attack on Pearl Harbor ===
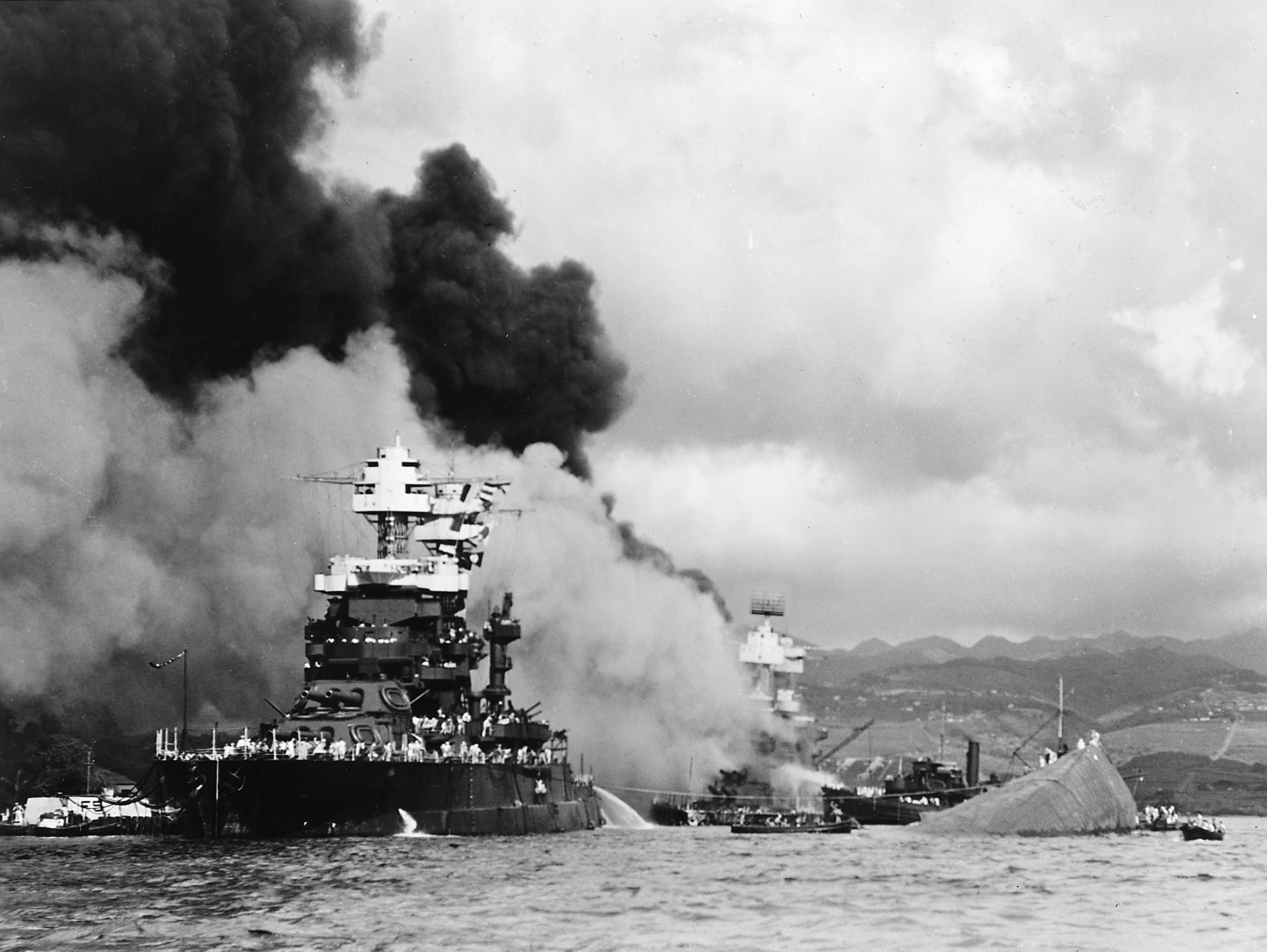
Maryland alongside the capsized Oklahoma during the attack on Pearl Harbor, as West Virginia burns in the background

On the morning of 7 December, Maryland was moored along Ford Island, with Oklahoma to port, connected by lines and a gangway. To her fore was California, while Tennessee and West Virginia were astern. Further aft were Nevada and Arizona. The seven battleships, in what is now known as "Battleship Row," had recently returned from maneuvers. Many of Maryland's crew were preparing for shore leave at 09:00 or eating breakfast when the Japanese attack began. As the first Japanese aircraft appeared and explosions rocked the outboard battleships, Maryland's bugler blew general quarters.

Seaman Leslie Short—addressing Christmas cards near his machine gun—brought the first of his ship's guns into play, shooting down one of two torpedo bombers that had just released against Oklahoma. Inboard of Oklahoma, and thus protected from the initial torpedo attack, Maryland managed to bring all her antiaircraft (AA) batteries into action. The devastating initial attack sank Oklahoma, and she capsized quickly, with many of her surviving men climbing aboard Maryland to assist her with anti-aircraft defenses.

Maryland was struck by two armor-piercing bombs which detonated low on her hull. The first struck the forecastle awning and made a hole about 12 ft (3.7 m) by 20 ft (6.1 m). The second exploded after entering the hull at the 22 ft (6.7 m) water level at Frame 10. The latter hit caused flooding and increased the draft forward by 5 ft (1.5 m). Maryland continued to fire and, after the attack, sent firefighting parties to assist her compatriots, especially attempting to rescue survivors from the capsized Oklahoma. The men continued to muster the AA defenses in case the Japanese returned to attack. In all, two officers and two men were killed in the attack.

The Japanese erroneously announced that Maryland had been sunk, but on 30 December, the damaged ship entered Puget Sound Navy Yard for repairs just behind Tennessee. Two of the original twelve 5-inch/51 cal guns were removed and the 5-inch/25 cal guns were replaced by an equal number of 5-inch/38 cal dual purpose guns. Over the course of the next two months, she was repaired and overhauled, receiving new fighting equipment. Repairs were complete on 26 February 1942. She then underwent a series of shakedown cruises to West Coast ports and Christmas Island. She was sent back into action in June 1942, the second battleship damaged at Pearl Harbor to return to duty.

=== Supporting patrols ===
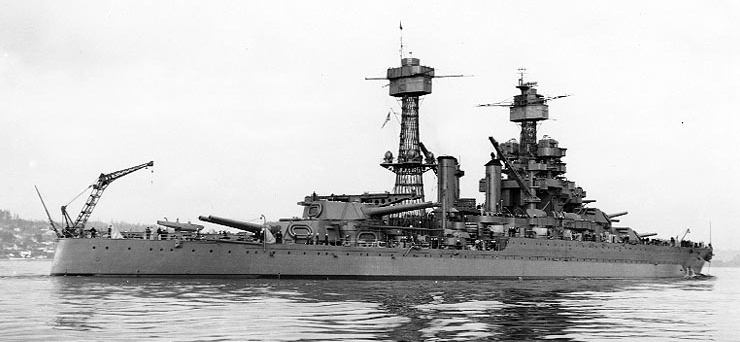
Maryland in February 1942, after the completion of her repairs

During the important Battle of Midway, Maryland played a supporting role. Like the other older battleships, she was not fast enough to accompany the aircraft carriers, so she operated with a backup fleet protecting the West Coast. Maryland stood by on security, awaiting the call that she was needed, until the end of the battle. At the end of the action around Midway, Maryland was sent to San Francisco.

Thereafter, Maryland engaged in almost constant training exercises with Battleship Division 2, Battleship Division 3, and Battleship Division 4 until 1 August, when she returned to Pearl Harbor for repairs, her first time in the harbor since the Japanese attack. She departed Pearl Harbor in early November with Colorado, bound for the forward area. On 12 November, King Neptune came aboard Maryland to initiate her "pollywogs" for the line-crossing ceremony. Maryland steamed for the Fiji Islands where she patrolled against Japanese incursion. The two battleships acted as sentinels to guard against Japanese advance to prevent Japanese forces from threatening Australia. During this duty, the two battleships conducted frequent sweeps for Japanese forces.

In early 1943, with the success of the Solomon Islands campaign, Allied forces went on the offensive. In February 1943, Maryland and Colorado moved to New Hebrides, operating off of Efate. Intense heat there proved difficult and unpleasant for the crew. She then moved to Espiritu Santo to guard against Japanese incursion, but heat and heavy rains plagued this tour of duty. Maryland and Colorado stood out of Aore Island Harbor in August. During a five-week overhaul at Pearl Harbor's shipyard, several 40 millimetres (1.6 in) AA guns were installed on the top decks and foremast as protection against anticipated Japanese air raids in future operations.

=== Battle of Tarawa ===
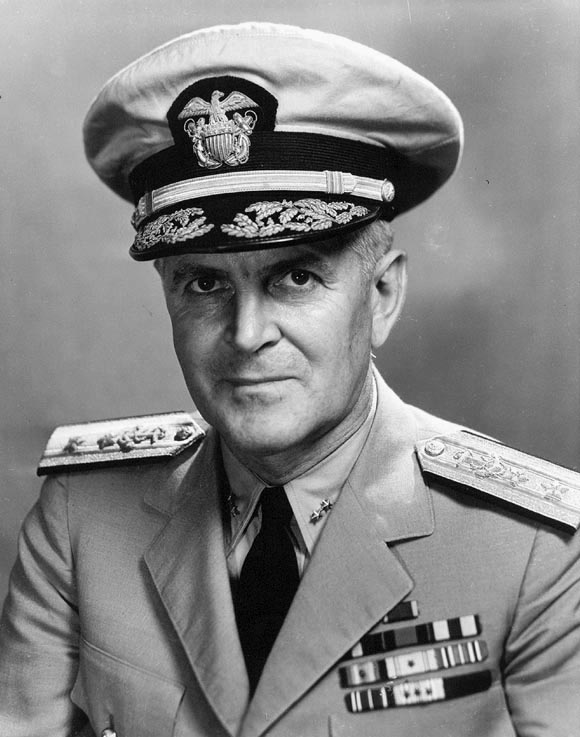
Rear Admiral Harry W. Hill, who used Maryland as his flagship during the Battle of Tarawa

Departing the Hawaiian Islands on 20 October 1943 for the South Pacific, Maryland became flagship for Rear Admiral Harry W. Hill's V Amphibious Force and Southern Attack Force in the Gilbert Islands Invasion. Also aboard her were Major General Julian C. Smith, commander of 2nd Marine Division, and Colonel Evans Carlson, commander of Carlson's Raiders. Maryland returned to Efate Island staging area, where she joined a large task force preparing for an assault on Tarawa.

The battle of Tarawa commenced on 20 November. In her first offensive action of the war, Maryland's guns opened fire at 05:00, destroying a shore battery with five salvos on the southwestern point of Betio Island in the Tarawa Atoll. At 06:00 she commenced a scheduled shore bombardment to soften up Japanese defenses ahead of the landings. Maryland moved closer to shore to attract Japanese fire and locate artillery emplacements, in the process raking Japanese gun emplacements, control stations, pillboxes and any Japanese installations she could spot. At 09:00 as Marine landing forces encountered heavy Japanese resistance and began taking casualties to emplaced crossfire, Maryland provided covering fire to eliminate several Japanese machine gun nests. Her scouting plane then began to cover the progress of the Marines' assault, with Maryland providing artillery support. The plane was damaged and pilot wounded in this action.

After three days of covering the offensive on Betio Island, she moved to Apamama Island to guard Marine landings there. Marines met with only light resistance from 30 Japanese soldiers there, and two prisoners were brought to Maryland. On 7 December, Maryland left Apamama Island for Pearl Harbor. After a brief stopover there, Maryland left for San Francisco for repairs.

=== Battle of Kwajalein Atoll ===
Maryland steamed from San Pedro, California on 13 January 1944, and rendezvoused with Task Force 53 at Lahaina Roads for two days of loading ammunition, refueling, and provisioning ahead of a new operation supporting the Marshall Islands campaign. On 30 January 1944, she moved to support landings on Roi Island, along with Santa Fe, Biloxi, and Indianapolis, which formed the Northern Support Group of TF 35.

In the predawn hours of 31 January, the ships began a bombardment of Kwajalein Atoll, the opening moves of the battle of Kwajalein. Maryland destroyed numerous Japanese stationary guns and pillboxes. In the course of the battle, she fired so much that she split the liners in the guns of Turret No. 1, putting it out of action for the rest of the day. On 1 February, she continued her attack on Japanese positions as the U.S. landing forces advanced. She became the flagship for Admiral Connally for the next two weeks, resupplying and refueling many of the smaller ships in the operation until she departed with a task unit of carriers and destroyers on 15 February 1944, steaming for Bremerton Navy Yard, where she underwent another overhaul, with her guns being replaced.

=== Battle of Saipan ===
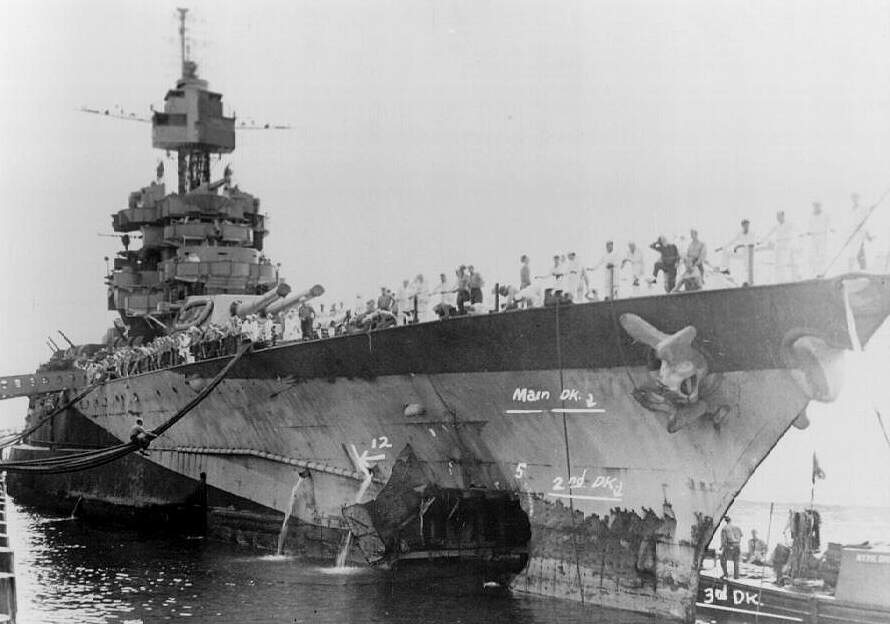
Maryland in Pearl Harbor Navy Yard, 10 July 1944, showing torpedo damage she sustained during the battle of Saipan

Two months later, Maryland sailed westward on 5 May, joining Task Force 52 headed for Saipan. Vice Admiral Richmond K. Turner allotted TF 52 three days to soften up the island's defenses ahead of the assault. Firing commenced at 05:45 on 14 June. TF 52 quickly destroyed two coastal guns, then began bombarding Garapan, destroying ammunition dumps, gun positions, small boats, storage tanks, blockhouses, and buildings. Maryland then turned her guns to Tanapag, leveling it in heavy bombardment. The invasion commenced 15 June, and Maryland provided fire support for the landing forces.

The Japanese attempted to counter the battleships by air. On 18 June, the ship's guns shot down their first Japanese aircraft, but on 22 June, a Mitsubishi G4M3 "Betty" medium bomber flew low over the still-contested Saipan hills and found Maryland and Pennsylvania. The Japanese plane dropped a torpedo, which blew a large hole in the starboard side of Maryland's bow. The attack caused light casualties, and in 15 minutes she was underway for Eniwetok, and from there she steamed for the repair yards at Pearl Harbor (in reverse the whole time so as not to do further damage to her bow), escorted by two destroyers. Two men were killed in the attack.

With an around-the-clock effort by the shipyard workers, Maryland was repaired in 34 days, departing on 13 August. She then embarked for the Solomon Islands with a large task force, anchoring in Purvis Bay off Florida Island for two weeks before steaming for the Palau Islands on 6 September. She then joined Rear Admiral Jesse B. Oldendorf's Western Fire Support Group (Task Group 32.5; TG 32.5). Firing first on 12 September to cover minesweeping operations and underwater demolition teams at the opening of the Battle of Peleliu, Maryland again conducted shore bombardment supporting the landing craft as they approached the beaches on 15 September. Four days later, organized resistance collapsed, permitting the fire support ships to retire to the Admiralty Islands at the end of the month.

=== Battle of Leyte Gulf ===
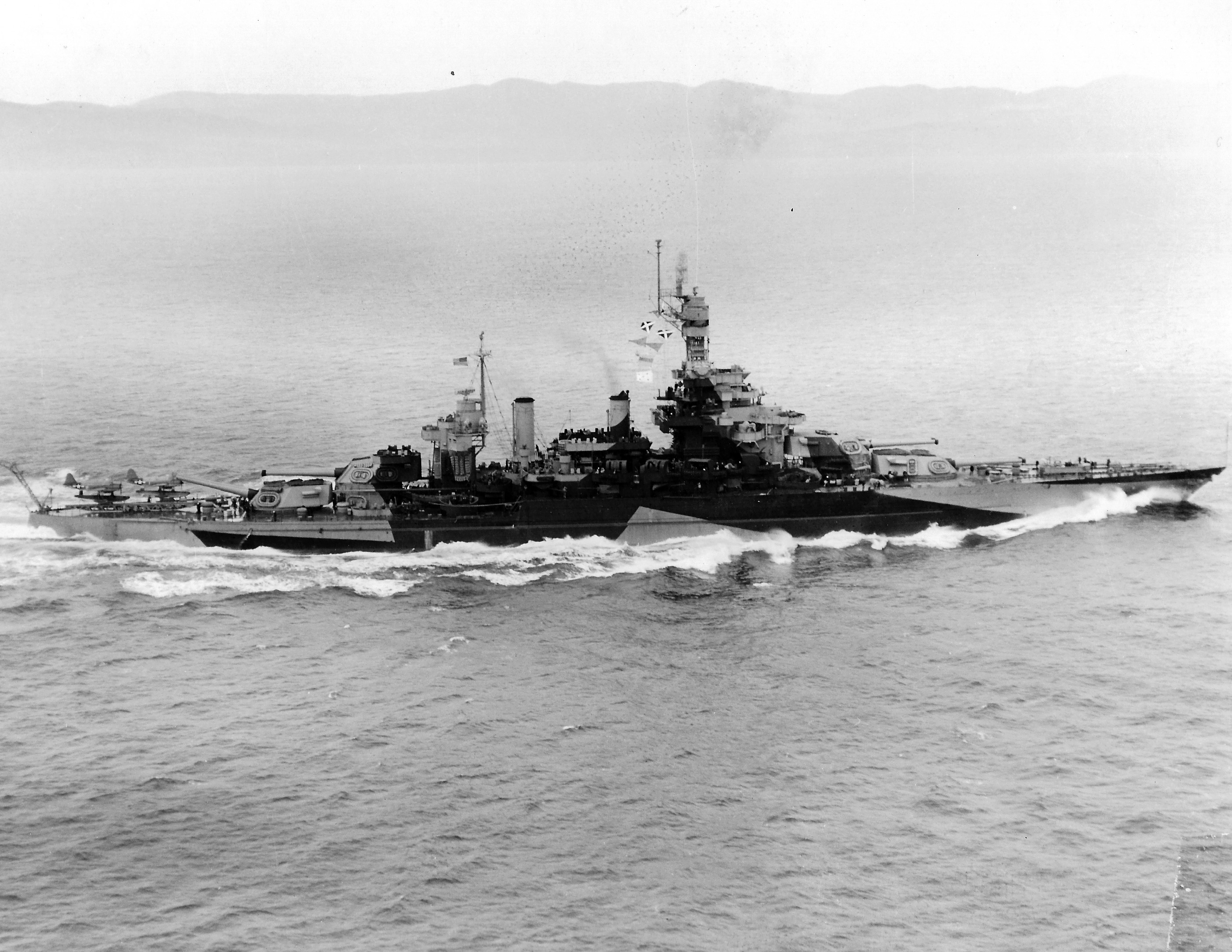
Maryland in 1944

Maryland steamed for Seeadler Harbor, Manus where she was assigned to the 7th Fleet under Admiral Kinkaid. The fleet sortied 12 October, and Maryland joined Task Group 77.2, which was the gunfire and covering force for the invasion of Leyte. She, along with four other battleships and numerous cruisers and destroyers, steamed into Leyte Gulf on the morning of 18 October. Maryland took position between Red and White Beaches and began bombarding them ahead of the invasion, which began at 10:00 20 October. Securing the beaches quickly, Maryland then took up a sentinel position in Leyte Gulf to guard the beaches against Japanese counterattack by sea.

For the next several days, Japanese forces launched air raids to counter the incursion. These included the first widespread use of the kamikaze suicide attack. Several days later, U.S. submarines in the South China Sea spotted two Japanese forces on approach: five battleships steaming toward San Bernardino Strait, and another force of four Japanese carriers in northern Luzon.

On 24 October, Maryland, West Virginia, Mississippi, Tennessee, California, and Pennsylvania sailed to the southern end of Leyte Gulf to protect Surigao Strait with several cruisers, destroyers, and PT Boats. Early on 25 October, during the Battle of Surigao Strait, Japanese battleships Fusō and Yamashiro, with their screens, led the Japanese advance into the Strait. At 03:55, the waiting Americans ships launched an ambush of the two Japanese battleships, pounding them with torpedoes and main guns. Torpedoes from the destroyers sank Fusō. Continued attacks by the task force also claimed Yamashiro. A few of the remaining Japanese ships then fled to the Mindanao Sea, pursued by Allied aircraft.

Following the victory, Maryland patrolled the southern approaches to Surigao Strait until 29 October; she then steamed for the Admiralty Isles for brief replenishment and resumed patrol duty around Leyte on 16 November, protecting the landing forces from continued Japanese air attacks. On 29 November, during another Japanese air attack, a kamikaze aircraft surprised and struck Maryland. The aircraft crashed into Maryland between Turrets No. 1 and 2, pierced the forecastle, main, and armored decks, and blew a hole in the 4-inch steel, causing extensive damage and starting fires. In all, 31 men were killed and 30 wounded in the attack, and the medical department was destroyed but still functional.

The battleship continued her patrols until relieved on 2 December, when she sailed with two heavily damaged destroyers for repairs. She reached Pearl Harbor on 18 December, and was extensively repaired and refitted over the next few months.

=== Battle of Okinawa ===
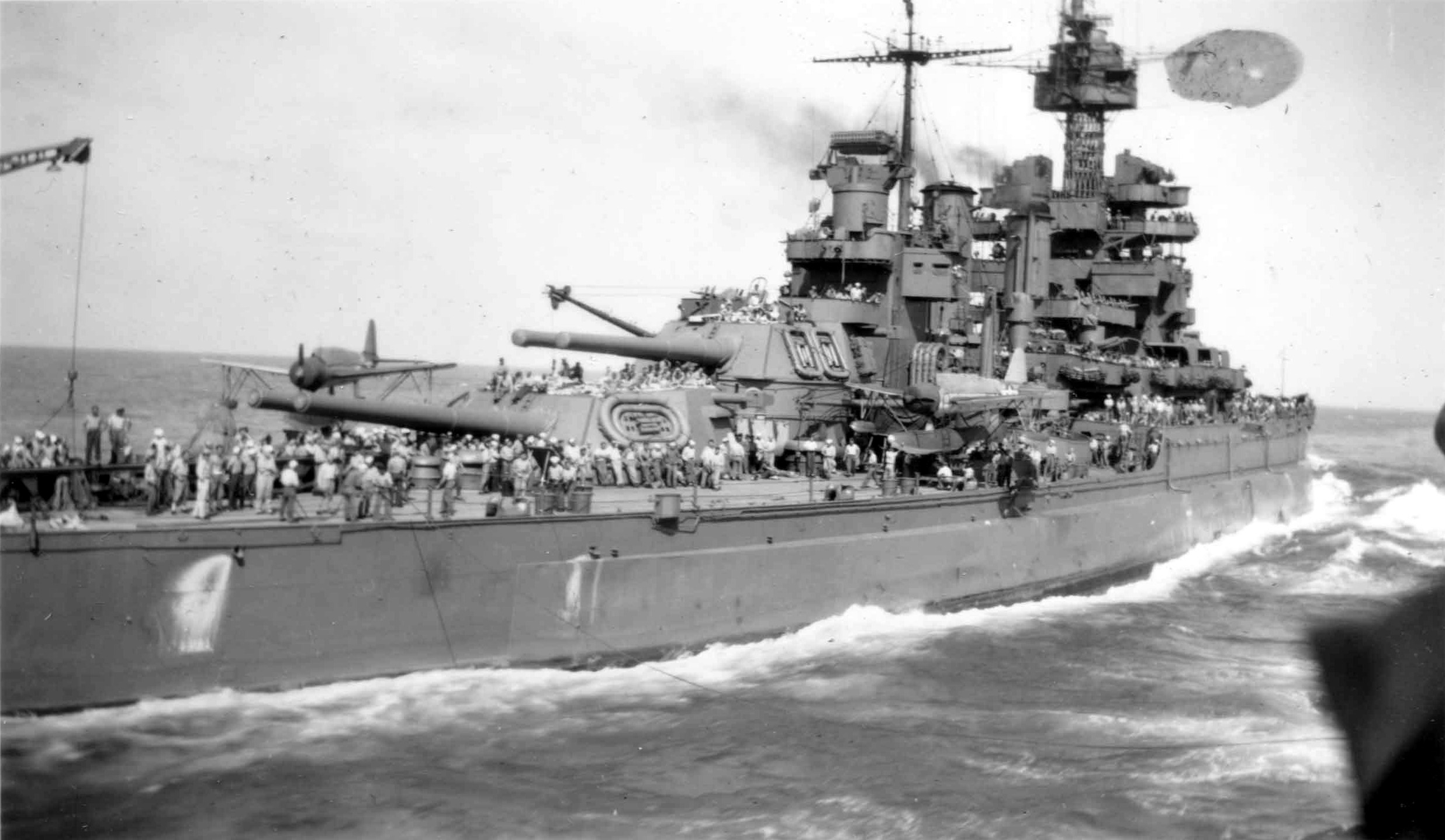
Maryland at sea in early 1945

After refresher training, Maryland headed for the western Pacific on 4 March 1945, arriving at Ulithi on 16 March. There she joined the 5th Fleet and Rear Admiral Morton Deyo's Task Force 54 (TF 54), which was preparing for the invasion of Okinawa. The fleet departed on 21 March, bound for Okinawa.

Maryland was assigned targets on the southern coast of Okinawa to support a diversionary landing, which would distract Japanese forces away from the main landing on the west coast. Japanese forces responded with several air raids, with two of Maryland's radar picket destroyers being struck by kamikaze planes, with Luce sinking. On 3 April, she was moved to the west coast invasion beaches to assist the cruiser Minneapolis in destroying several shore batteries. Following the land invasion, she remained with the support force off Bolo Point providing artillery support for the invading troops.

Maryland continued fire support duty until 7 April, when she steamed north to intercept a Japanese surface force with TF 54. The Japanese ships, including the Yamato, came under constant U.S. air attacks that day, and planes of the Fast Carrier Task Force sank six of the 10 ships in the force. At dusk, a kamikaze loaded with a 551 lb (250 kg) bomb crashed the top of Turret No. 3 from starboard. The explosion wiped out the 20 mm mounts and caused a large fire. The 20mm ammunition ignited from the heat, causing further casualties. In all, 10 were killed, 37 injured and 6 missing following this attack. Maryland remained on station for the next week and continued her artillery support mission through several more air raids. Turret No. 3, damaged but usable, remained silent for the remainder of this mission.

On 14 April, Maryland left the firing line at Okinawa and escorted several retiring transports. They steamed via the Mariana Islands and Guam to Pearl Harbor, and she reached the Puget Sound Navy Yard at Bremerton on 7 May for repairs and an extensive refit. All of her 5 in guns were removed and replaced by sixteen 5 inch/38 cal guns in new twin mounts. The light AA armament was revised to forty Bofors 40 mm in ten quad mounts and thirty-six Oerlikon 20 mm in eighteen dual mounts, though another source gives Maryland forty-four 40 mm in eleven quad mounts and forty-four 20 mm in twenty twin and one quad mount in the same timeframe. The armored conning tower was removed and replaced by a similar but lighter STS structure with only 1.2 in (30 mm) armor to compensate for the extra weight gained during this refit. An extra 3in of STS was added over the magazines, with 2 in (51 mm) elsewhere over the protective deck, while turret-top armor was raised to 7 in (180 mm). New double-layer anti-torpedo bulges were installed, increasing the armored freeboard to compensate for the increase in weight. SK-2 radar was installed in place of the previous SK, and the main battery received new Mk.13 radars for fire control. Turret No. 3 was repaired and the crew quarters were improved. She completed repairs and upgrades in August, leaving for tests and training runs just as Japan surrendered, ending the war.

=== Post-war ===
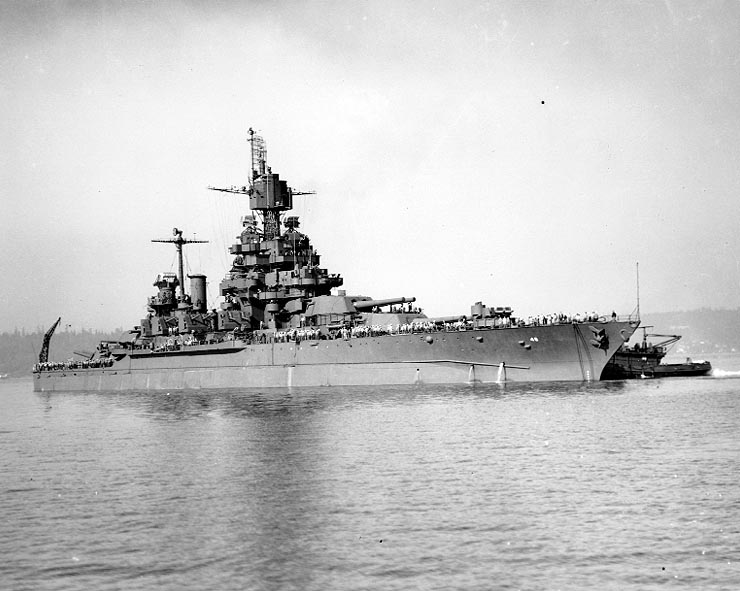
Maryland in Puget Sound Navy Yard in August 1945, with her refit completed just as the war ended.

Maryland now joined the Operation Magic Carpet fleet. During the remaining months of 1945, Maryland made five voyages between the west coast and Pearl Harbor, returning more than 8,000 servicemen to the United States. Arriving at Seattle, Washington on 17 December, Maryland completed her Operation Magic Carpet duty. She entered Puget Sound Naval Shipyard on 15 April 1946, and was placed in commission in inactive reserve on 16 July. She was decommissioned at Bremerton on 3 April 1947, and remained there as a unit of the Pacific Reserve Fleet. Maryland was sold for scrapping to Learner Company of Oakland, California on 8 July 1959.

On 2 June 1961, Governor of Maryland J. Millard Tawes, dedicated a monument to the memory of Maryland and her men. Built of granite and bronze and incorporating the ship's bell, this monument is located on the grounds of the State House in Annapolis.
