= The Dakotas (disambiguation) =

The Dakotas is the region that combines the US states of North and South Dakota.

The Dakotas may also refer to:

- The Dakotas, the former Dakota Territory in the US
- The Dakotas (TV series)
- The Dakotas (band)

== See also ==
- The Dakota, New York City apartment building complex
- Dakota (disambiguation)
- North Dakota (disambiguation)
- South Dakota (disambiguation)
