= South Dakota-class battleship =

South Dakota-class battleship may refer to either of two battleship classes of the United States Navy:

- South Dakota-class battleship (1920), a class of six ships authorized but never completed
- South Dakota-class battleship (1939), a class of four ships which saw service in World War II

== See also ==
- South Dakota (disambiguation)
- USS South Dakota
