= South Dakota (disambiguation) =

South Dakota is a state in the United States.

South Dakota may also refer to:

- University of South Dakota, a public coeducational research (R2) university in Vermillion
  - South Dakota Coyotes athletic teams representing the University of South Dakota
- South Dakota State University, a public research university in Brookings
  - South Dakota State Jackrabbits athletic teams representing South Dakota State University
- USS South Dakota, the name of three ships of the U.S. Navy
- South Dakota-class battleship (1920), a class of six ships authorized but never completed
- South Dakota-class battleship (1939), a class of four ships which saw service in World War II
- 26715 South Dakota, an asteroid

== See also ==
- Dakota (disambiguation)
