= North Dakota (disambiguation) =

North Dakota is a state in the United States.

North Dakota may also refer to:

- USS North Dakota (BB-29), former battleship
- USS North Dakota (SSN-784), submarine
- North Dakota State University
  - North Dakota State Bison athletic teams representing the state university
- "North Dakota", song on Thrush Hermit's album Sweet Homewrecker
- North Dakota, pseudonym for a character in Dan Brown's novel Digital Fortress
- North Dakota (album)
- University of North Dakota
  - North Dakota Fighting Hawks athletic teams representing the university

== See also ==
- Dakota (disambiguation)
- Dakota North (disambiguation)
- SS Flickertail State, named for the state of North Dakota, which is also known as the Flickertail State
