= USS Indiana (BB-58) =

Fast battleship of the United States Navy

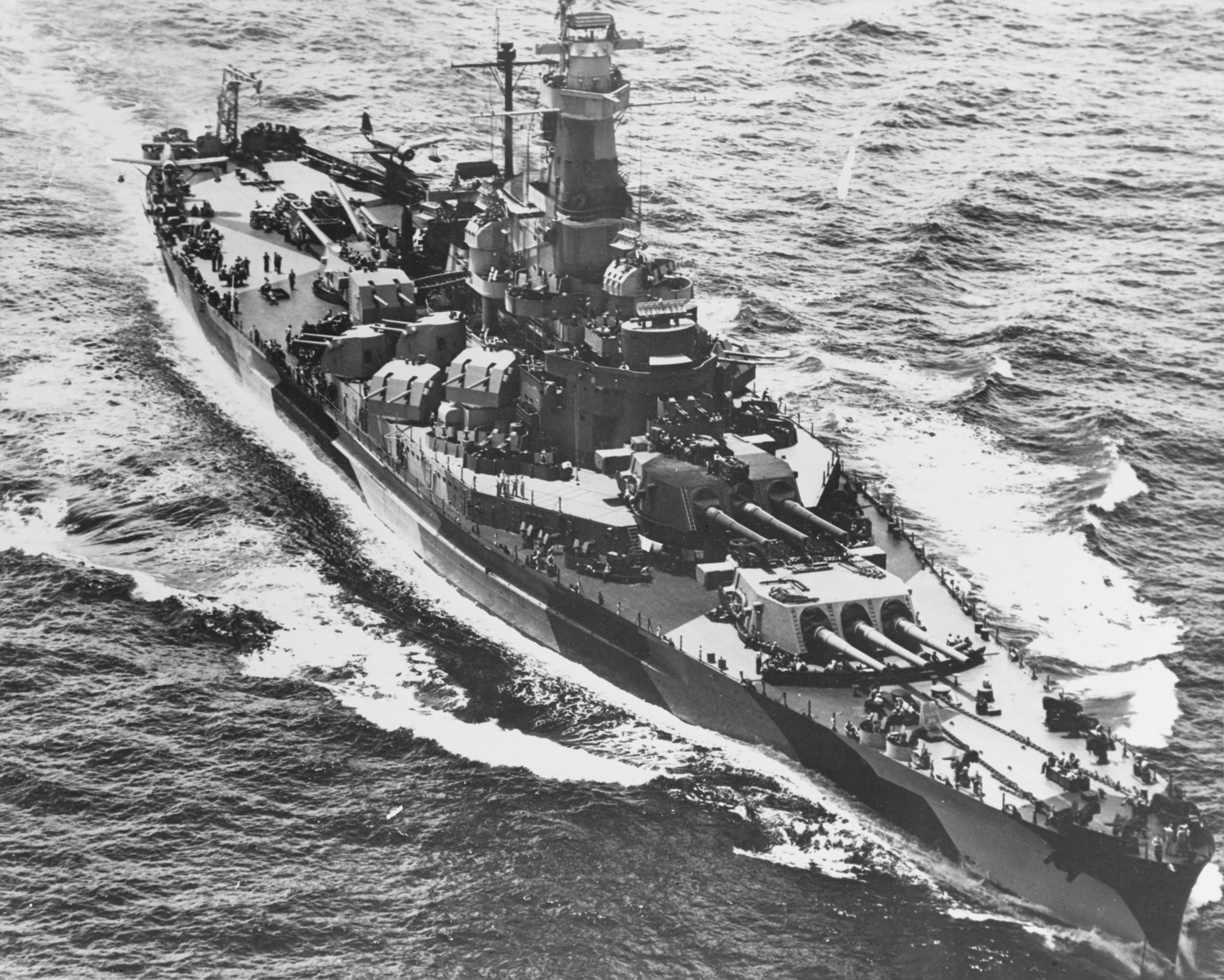
- USS Indiana, underway in 1944

History

United States
- Namesake: Indiana
- Builder: Newport News Shipbuilding
- Laid down: 20 November 1939
- Launched: 21 November 1941
- Commissioned: 30 April 1942
- Decommissioned: 11 September 1947
- Stricken: 1 June 1962
- Fate: Broken up, 1963

General characteristics
- Class & type: South Dakota-class battleship
- Displacement: Standard: 37,970 long tons (38,579 t); Full load: 44,519 long tons (45,233 t)
- Length: 680 ft (210 m) o/a
- Beam: 108 ft 2 in (32.97 m)
- Draft: 35 ft 1 in (10.69 m)
- Installed power: 130,000 shp (97,000 kW); 8 × Babcock & Wilcox boilers
- Propulsion: 4 × steam turbines; 4 × screw propellers
- Speed: 27.5 knots (50.9 km/h; 31.6 mph)
- Range: 15,000 nmi (28,000 km; 17,000 mi) at 15 knots (28 km/h; 17 mph)
- Crew: 1,793 officers and enlisted men (peace); 2,500 officers and enlisted men (war)
- Armament: 9 × 16 in (406 mm) guns; 20 × 5 in (127 mm) DP guns; 7 × quad 40 mm (1.6 in) AA guns; 35 × single 20 mm (0.8 in) AA guns
- Armor: Belt: 12.2 in (310 mm); Deck: 6 in (152 mm); Turrets: 18 in (457.2 mm); Barbettes: 17.3 in (440 mm); Conning tower: 16 in
- Aircraft carried: 3 × "Kingfisher" floatplanes
- Aviation facilities: 2 × catapults

USS Indiana, hull number BB-58, was the second of four South Dakota-class battleships built for the United States Navy in the 1930s. The first American battleships designed after the Washington treaty system began to break down in the mid-1930s, they took advantage of an escalator clause that allowed increasing the main battery to 16-inch (406 mm) guns, but refusal to authorize larger battleships kept their displacement close to the Washington limit of 35,000 long tons (35,562 t). A requirement to be armored against the same caliber of guns as they carried, combined with the displacement restriction, resulted in cramped ships, a problem that was exacerbated as wartime modifications that considerably strengthened their anti-aircraft batteries significantly increased their crews.

Indiana entered service in April 1942, by which time the United States was engaged in World War II, and the ship was immediately pressed into action in the Pacific War against Japan. Her first combat came in late 1942 when she supported marines fighting during the Guadalcanal campaign. Over the next three years, she was occupied with two primary roles: naval gunfire support for amphibious assaults across the Pacific and anti-aircraft defense for the fast carrier task force. She shelled Japanese positions during the Battle of Tarawa in November 1943 and the Battle of Kwajalein in February 1944. During the latter operation, she collided with the battleship Washington and was forced to withdraw for repairs.

After returning to the fleet in April 1944, she took part in the Mariana and Palau Islands campaign, bombarding Saipan and helping to defend the fleet during the Battle of the Philippine Sea. Engine problems prevented her from participating in the Battle of Peleliu in September, but she was present for the Battles of Iwo Jima and Okinawa in 1945. In the latter action, she shot down a number of kamikazes. Following the Japanese surrender in August, she contributed men to the occupation force before returning to the United States in September. After a final refit, she was placed in reserve and remained inactive in the Navy's inventory until 1962 when she was stricken from the Naval Vessel Register and sold for scrap the following year.

== Design ==
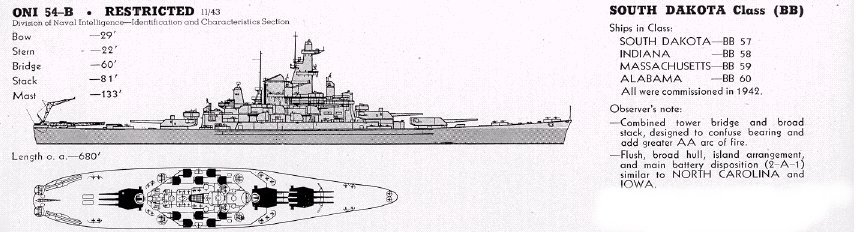
Recognition drawing of the South Dakota class

The South Dakota class was ordered in the context of global naval rearmament during the breakdown of the Washington treaty system that had controlled battleships construction during the 1920s and early 1930s. Under the Washington and London treaties, so-called treaty battleships were limited to a standard displacement of 35,000 long tons (35,562 t) and a main battery of 14-inch (356 mm) guns. In 1936, following Japan's decision to abandon the treaty system, the United States Navy decided to invoke the "escalator clause" in the Second London treaty that allowed displacements to rise to 45,000 long tons (45,722 t) and armament to increase to 16 in (406 mm) guns. Congressional objections to increasing the size of the new ships forced the design staff to keep displacement as close to 35,000 LT as possible while incorporating the larger guns and armor sufficient to defeat guns of the same caliber.

Indiana was 680 feet (210 m) long overall and had a beam of 108 ft 2 in (32.97 m) and a draft of 35 ft 1 in (10.69 m). She displaced 37,970 long tons (38,579 t) as designed and up to 44,519 long tons (45,233 t) at full combat load. The ship was powered by four General Electric (GE) steam turbines, each driving one propeller shaft, using steam provided by eight oil-fired Babcock & Wilcox boilers. Rated at 130,000 shaft horsepower (97,000 kW), the turbines were intended to give a top speed of 27.5 knots (50.9 km/h; 31.6 mph). The ship had a cruising range of 15,000 nautical miles (28,000 km; 17,000 mi) at a speed of 15 knots (28 km/h; 17 mph). She carried three Vought OS2U Kingfisher floatplanes for aerial reconnaissance, which were launched by a pair of aircraft catapults on her fantail. Her peace time crew numbered 1,793 officers and enlisted men, but during the war the crew swelled to 2,500 officers and enlisted.

The ship was armed with a main battery of nine 16"/45 caliber Mark 6 guns (Note: /45 refers to the length of the gun in terms of calibers. A /45 gun is 45 times long as it is in bore diameter.) guns in three triple-gun turrets on the centerline, two of which were placed in a superfiring pair forward, with the third aft. The secondary battery consisted of twenty 5-inch /38 caliber dual purpose guns mounted in twin turrets clustered amidships, five turrets on either side. As designed, the ship was equipped with an anti-aircraft battery of twelve 1.1 in (28 mm) guns and twelve .50-caliber (12.7 mm) M2 Browning machine guns, (Note: In the context of small arms, caliber refers to the bore diameter; in this case, a .50-caliber machine gun is a half-inch in diameter.) but she was completed with a battery of seven quadruple 40 mm (1.6 in) Bofors guns in place of the 1.1 in guns and thirty-five 20 mm (0.79 in) Oerlikon autocannon instead of the .50-cal. guns.

The main armored belt was 12.2 in (310 mm) thick, while the main armored deck was up to 6 in (152 mm) thick. The main battery gun turrets had 18 in (457 mm) thick faces, and they were mounted atop barbettes that were 17.3 in (440 mm) thick. The conning tower had 16 in (406 mm) thick sides.

=== Modifications ===
Indiana received a series of modifications through her wartime career, consisting primarily of additions to anti-aircraft battery and various types of radar sets. The first addition was the installation of SC air search radar in 1941, fitted in the foremast, which was later replaced with an SK type set. At the same time, an SG surface search radar was installed on the forward superstructure; a second SG set was added to the main mast after experiences during the Guadalcanal campaign in 1942. In 1943, she received a Mark 3 fire-control radar, mounted on her conning tower to assist in the direction of her main battery guns. The Mark 3 was quickly replaced with more modern Mark 8 fire-control radar, and Mark 4 radars for the secondary battery guns. She later received Mark 12/22 sets in place of the Mark 4s. Indiana also received a TDY jammer. In 1945, her traditional spotting scopes were replaced with Mark 27 microwave radar sets.

The ship's light anti-aircraft battery was gradually expanded. Three more 40 mm quad mounts were added in late 1942. By January 1943, she had another eighteen 20 mm guns installed, bringing the total to fifty-three of the guns. Two more 40 mm quadruple mounts were added in February, and another seven 20 mm guns were added later that year for a total battery of sixty barrels. By July 1944, Indiana had had five of the 20 mm guns removed; three more had been removed by the end of the war in mid-1945.

== Service history ==
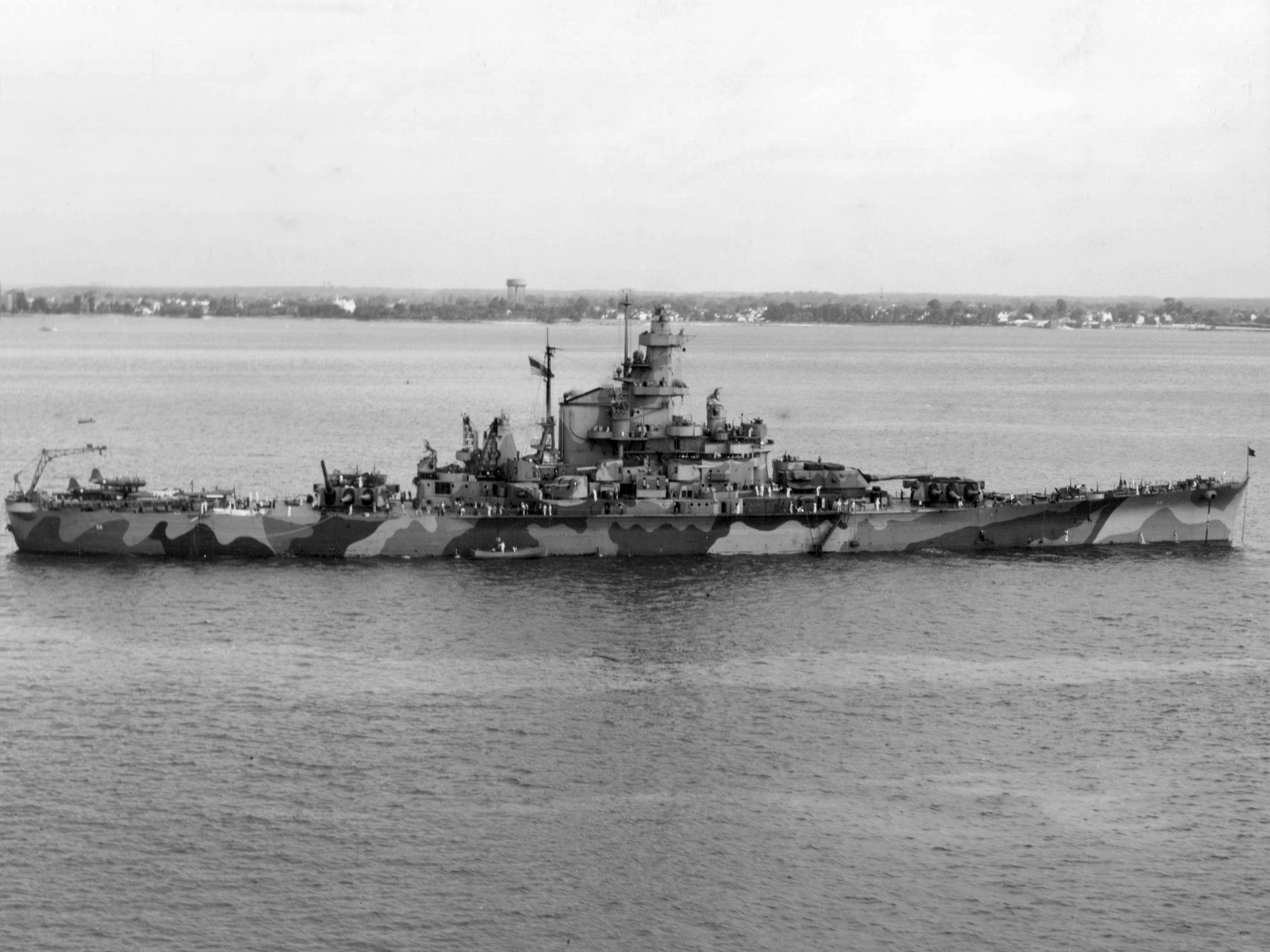
USS Indiana while on trials, 8 September 1942

=== Construction ===
The new battleship was authorized on 27 March 1934 by the Vinson-Trammell Act, and President Franklin D. Roosevelt approved the name Indiana on 21 September 1938. The keel for Indiana was laid down on 20 November 1939 at the Newport News Shipbuilding and Dry Dock Company of Newport News, Virginia. The completed hull was launched on 21 November 1941, with the christening performed by Margaret Robbins, the daughter of the Governor of Indiana, Henry F. Schricker. Indiana was completed by April 1942 and was commissioned into the fleet on the 30th. Then-Captain Aaron S. Merrill was the ship's first commanding officer. During the elaborate commissioning ceremony, which was attended by Secretary of the Navy Frank Knox, the ship flew the flag from the old battleship Indiana that had been used during the Battle of Santiago de Cuba in 1898.

Fitting-out work continued at Newport News through 20 May, and the following day Indiana departed on sea trials. Initial trials were conducted in Chesapeake Bay from 26 to 29 May; on the 31st, she departed for Hampton Roads, Virginia. Speed trials followed on 1 June, during which she was escorted by the destroyers Charles F. Hughes, Hilary P. Jones, Ingraham, and Woolsey. Trials, gunnery training, and various exercises continued into September, and on the 29th she departed for Casco Bay in Maine for more gunnery training. The ship was declared fit for combat service on 9 November, and she departed for the Panama Canal that day. By this time, the United States had been at war with Germany and Japan for nearly a year, and was in the midst of the Guadalcanal Campaign in the Pacific; Indiana was ordered to join the forces engaged there.

=== Pacific Theater operations ===
==== Battles of Guadalcanal, Tarawa, and Kwajalein ====
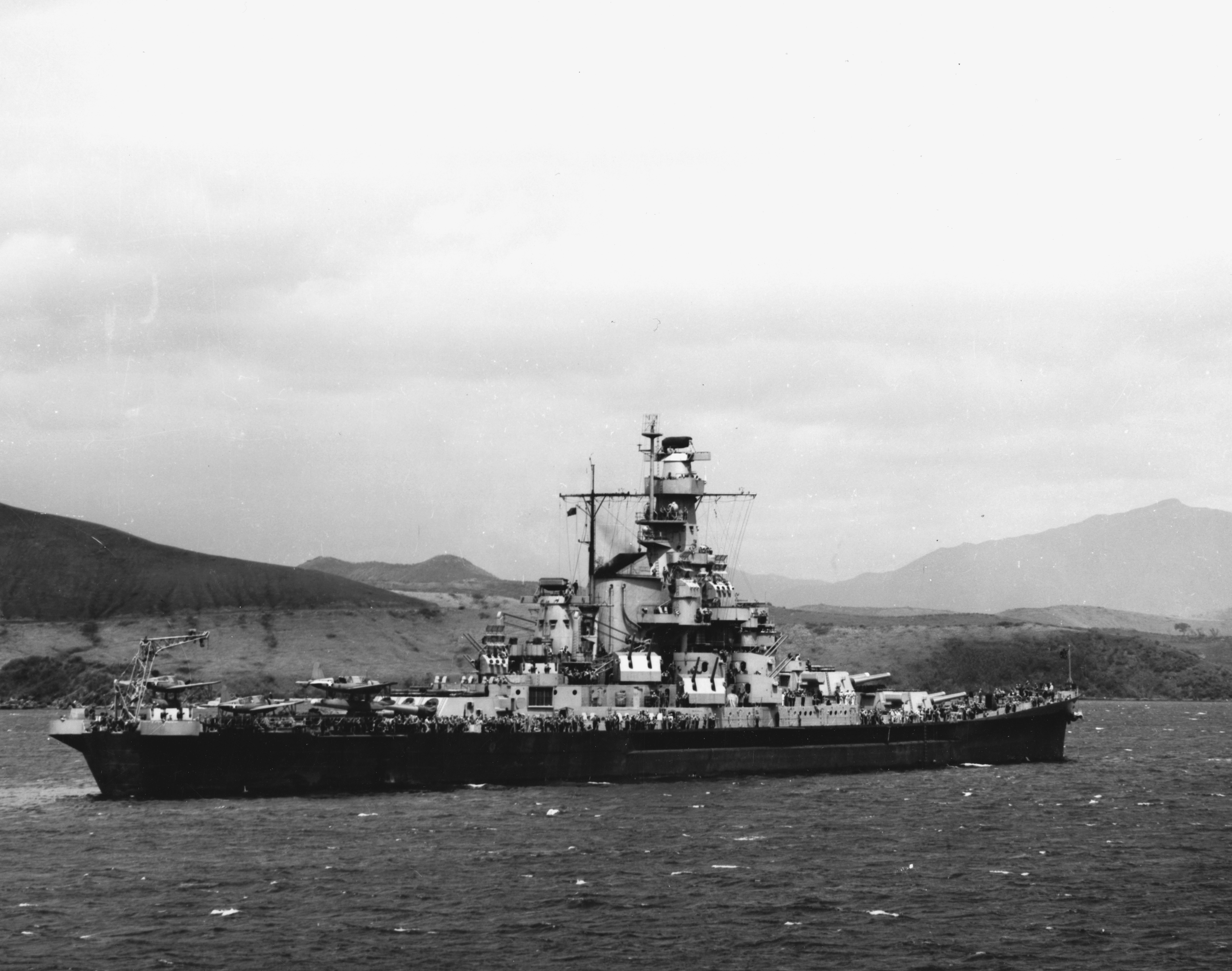
Indiana in the South Pacific in December 1942

On 14 November, Indiana was assigned as the flagship for Task Group (TG) 2.6, which included the light cruiser Columbia and the destroyers De Haven and Saufley. The four ships then proceeded to Tonga, arriving on the afternoon of 28 November. After refueling, Indiana transferred to TG 66.6 two days later and continued on to Nouméa, arriving on 2 December. There, she took part in exercises with ships from Task Force (TF) 64. The ship served as a replacement for her sister South Dakota, which had been badly damaged during the Second Naval Battle of Guadalcanal; while operating off Guadalcanal, Indiana provided gunfire support to American forces ashore.

By January 1943, the ship had been joined by the fast battleships North Carolina and Washington; the three battleships were grouped together as TF 64 under Rear Admiral Willis Lee, and they covered convoys to support the fighting in the Solomons into the next year. These operations included covering a group of seven transports carrying elements of the 25th Infantry Division to Guadalcanal from 1 to 4 January 1943. During another of these convoy operations later that month, the battleships were too far south to come to aid of the American cruiser force during the Battle of Rennell Island at the end of the month. During the invasion of New Georgia, the battleship force, which now included Indiana, North Carolina, and Massachusetts, was assigned to cover the invasion fleet against possible Japanese attacks. Indiana supported the carrier task force that raided Marcus Island on 31 August – 1 September. She took part in the invasion of Tarawa on 20–23 November and provided part of the anti-aircraft screen for the aircraft carriers of Task Group 50.2 off Makin Atoll, including Enterprise, Belleau Wood, and Monterey. During operations in the area, Indiana's anti-aircraft gunners claimed their first Japanese aircraft. On 8 December, Indiana, four other battleships, and twelve destroyers bombarded Japanese positions on Nauru. Between the five battleships, a total of 810 sixteen-inch shells were fired at the island.

On 1 January 1944, Indiana was assigned to TG 37.2, and on 16 January she took part in gunnery practice with South Dakota and the destroyers USS Burns, Charrette, and USS Conner. The five ships, joined by North Carolina, Washington, and three more destroyers, then got underway on 18 January for the next major amphibious operation the Pacific, the Marshall Islands campaign. While en route, the ships conducted training with their anti-aircraft batteries. They rendezvoused with the carriers Bunker Hill and Monterey at sea, and after arriving in Funafuti on 20 January the unit was redesignated as TG 58.1. By this time, the group had grown to include the carriers Enterprise, Yorktown, Belleau Wood, and several more cruisers and destroyers. Further training took place from 25 to 28 January, including more anti-aircraft practice; Indiana also served as a target for simulated air attacks from the carrier aircraft. During the operation, Indiana served as the flagship of Battleship Division 8 (BatDiv), commanded by Rear Admiral Glenn B. Davis.

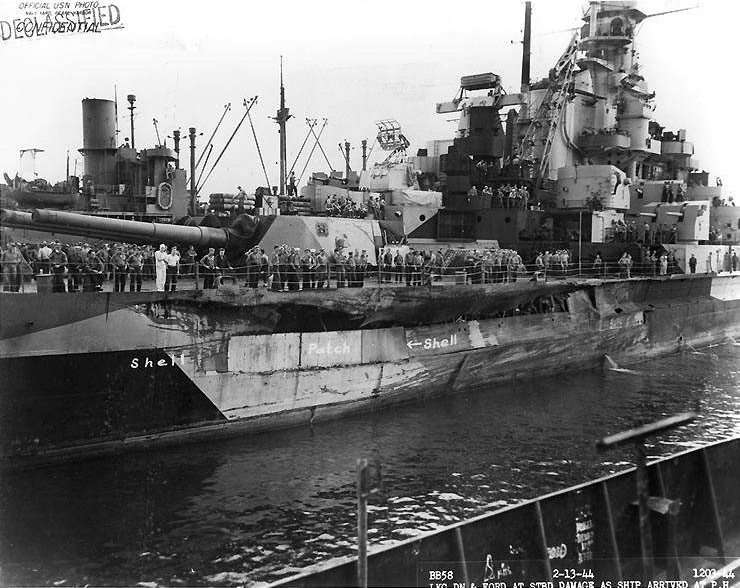
Indiana in dock in Pearl Harbor showing the temporary repairs after the collision with Washington

In late January, Indiana took part in operations to prepare for the invasion of Kwajalein in the Marshall Islands. On 29 January, the ship attacked Maloelap Atoll, along with Washington and the aircraft carriers Enterprise and Yorktown, and the following day the ships began bombarding Kwajalein to soften Japanese defenses. On 30 January, Indiana, Massachusetts, and Washington, escorted by four destroyers, were detached to shell Kwajalein as part of the invasion bombardment. They reached their firing positions early the next morning and Indiana opened fire at 09:56; she and the other ships sank a submarine chaser and five guard ships that were moored in the atoll. Japanese artillery batteries engaged the American ships, but Indiana was not hit. She continued to bombard Japanese positions around the island until 14:48 before departing at 17:15 to return to the carriers. She had fired some 306 shells from her main battery and 2,385 rounds from her 5-inch guns.

Indiana thereafter withdrew to escort the carrier task force overnight. While operating off the islands in the early hours of 1 February, Indiana collided with Washington. The ships were blacked out to prevent Japanese observers from spotting them, and in the darkness, Indiana turned in front of Washington. Indiana was badly damaged, with the starboard propeller shaft destroyed and significant damaged inflicted on the belt armor and torpedo defense system. The ship had some 200 ft (61 m) of armor plating torn from her hull, and Washington had a 20 ft (6.1 m) section of her bow ripped away and lodged into Indiana's side. The accident killed three men and injured another six aboard Indiana, one of whom later died. A subsequent inquiry into the accident placed the blame on Indiana, faulting her crew for failing to inform the other ships in the unit about her course changes.

Davis transferred his flag to another vessel and on 2 February, Indiana departed for Majuro for temporary repairs before proceeding on to Pearl Harbor on 7 February in company with the escorting destroyer Remey and the destroyer escort Burden R. Hastings. Four days later, two more destroyers joined the group, which reached Pearl Harbor on 13 February. Indiana was dry-docked the next day for repairs that lasted until 7 April. She then conducted sea trials and test fired her main battery to ensure there were no remaining structural issues from the collision. She spent the next two weeks training her gun crews before departing in late April to rejoin the fleet for the next operation in the central Pacific.

==== Marianas campaign ====
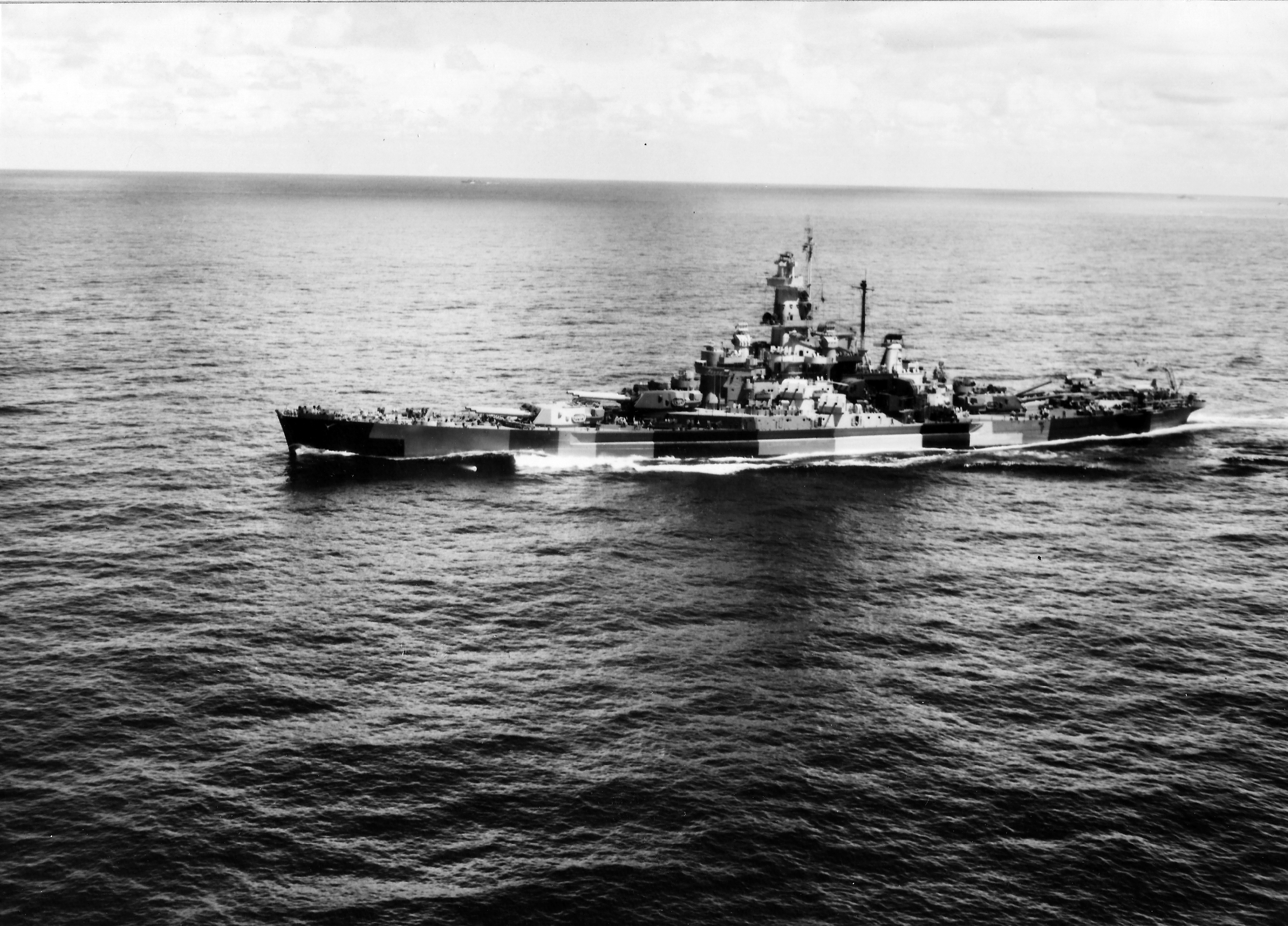
Indiana underway in January 1944

Indiana arrived in Seeadler Harbor, Manus Island on 26 April and Davis came back aboard his flagship two days later. That same day, she got underway in company with Massachusetts and four destroyers to join TF 58 for Operation Hailstone, the major attack on Truk Atoll conducted over the course of 29–30 April. On 1 May, Indiana took part in an attack on Pohnpei in the Senyavin Islands, shelling the island for about an hour before disengaging after having difficulty in locating suitable targets. Three days later the American fleet arrived in Majuro, where it began preparations for the invasion of several islands in the Marianas. The fleet sortied on 6 June to embark on the first stage of the campaign, the invasion of Saipan. Indiana, Washington, and four escorting destroyers were designated as Task Unit (TU) 58.7.3, the Western Bombardment Unit; over the course of the pre-invasion bombardment that began on 13 June and continued for two days, Indiana fired 584 shells from her main battery. Late in the day on 15 June, after the ground forces had gone ashore, Japanese air strikes targeted the invasion fleet. Indiana began evasive maneuvers to avoid the attacks, including a torpedo bomber that launched a torpedo at the ship at around 19:10 that failed to explode. Her anti-aircraft gunners shot the aircraft down, along with another bomber three minutes later. The ship was not damaged in the attacks and remained on station.

A more significant Japanese counterattack came in the form of the 1st Mobile Fleet, the main carrier strike force. In the ensuing Battle of the Philippine Sea from 19 to 20 June, Indiana provided anti-aircraft support to the American carrier fleet. She and South Dakota reported the initial wave of Japanese aircraft early on 19 June, and at 10:48 her anti-aircraft gunners opened fire, quickly shooting down one Japanese aircraft. The ship was forced to take evasive maneuvers at around 11:50, when a torpedo bomber attacked her; the torpedo exploded harmlessly in the ship's wake. As a Japanese fighter approached to strafe Indiana, her guns shot away the plane's tail at 12:13, sending it crashing into the sea. The ship's luck ran out shortly thereafter, as a burning Nakajima B5N2 torpedo bomber crashed into her starboard side, hurling burning debris over the deck. The ship was not damaged in the crash and Indiana remained on station. In the course of the battle, she had fired 416 shells from her secondary guns, 4,832 rounds of 40 mm ammunition and around 9,000 rounds from her 20 mm guns; she suffered five casualties, all men injured by shell fragments from other ships' anti-aircraft guns.

On 4 July, one of Indiana's Kingfishers picked up two men from the carrier Lexington after their aircraft had gone down. Indiana remained off the Marianas until early August when she was detached to Eniwetok to replenish ammunition and supplies. She got underway on 30 August with TF 34 and met TG 38 on 3 September, which was scheduled to attack the Palau Islands later that month. Indiana developed engine problems, however, and she was sent to Seeadler Harbor for repairs that lasted from 21 September to 4 October. During this period, Davis shifted his flag to Massachusetts. Indiana then joined the battleship Idaho and the cruisers Indianapolis and Cleveland for the voyage to Pearl Harbor. They arrived there on 14 October, and two days later Indiana and Idaho, escorted by two destroyers, left for Puget Sound Navy Yard for a thorough overhaul that was completed on 30 November. Following another round of sea trials, Indiana left on 6 December, bound for Pearl Harbor, where she conducted training exercises and additional repairs that lasted through the end of the year.

==== Battles of Iwo Jima and Okinawa ====
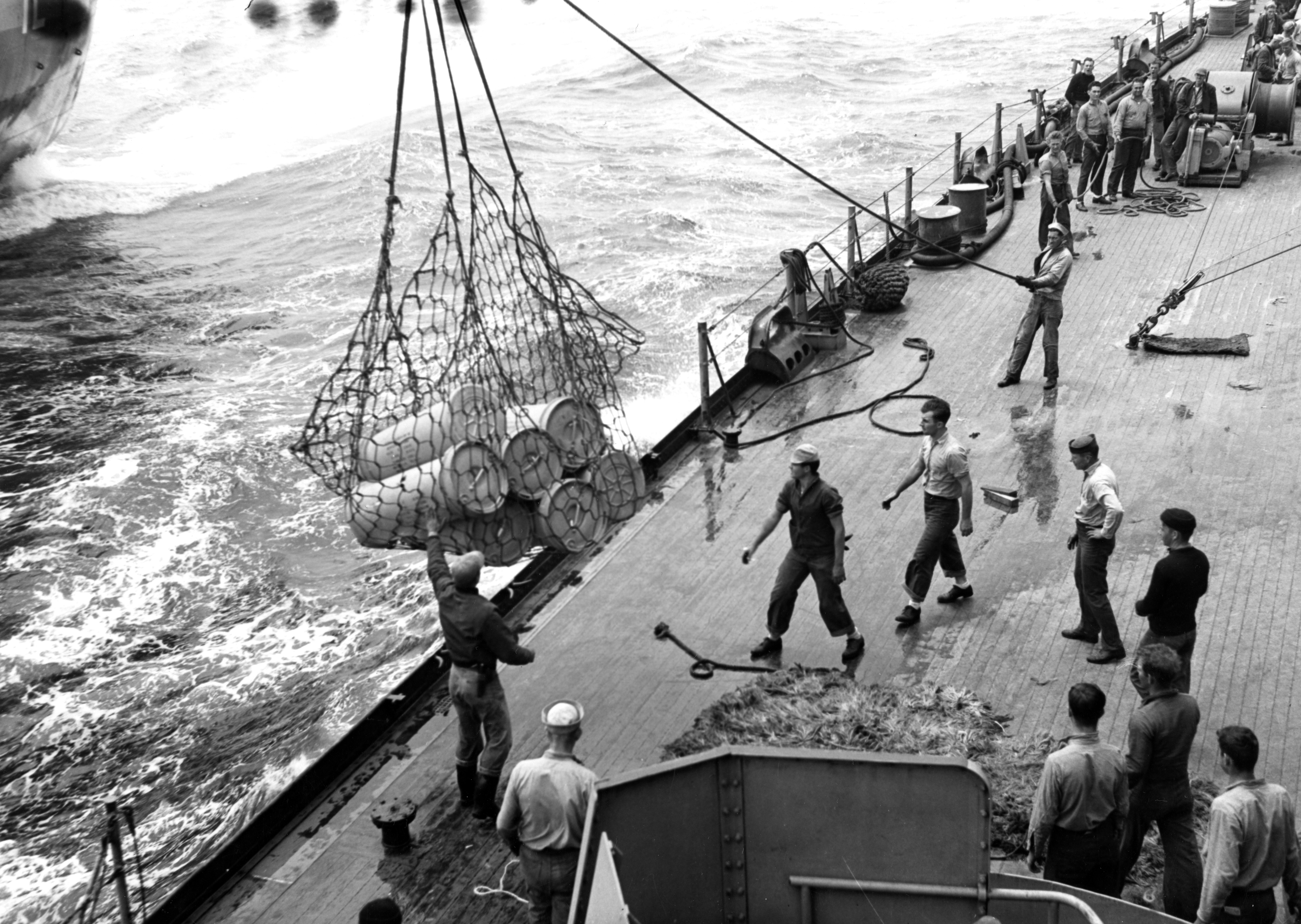
Indiana's crew loading propellant charges off Okinawa

Rear Admiral Oscar C. Badger II, the commander of TU 12.5.2, hoisted his flag aboard the ship on 8 January 1945, and she departed Pearl Harbor two days later in company with the destroyer Borie and the destroyer minelayer Gwin. The ships cruised to Eniwetok, and from there, continued on to Saipan where she joined the rest of her unit on 20 January. The unit sortied on 22 January, headed for Iwo Jima and arrived there two days later. On arrival, Indiana, three heavy cruisers, seven destroyers, and Gwin shelled the island in preparation for the invasion of the island a month later. At 13:17, a Nakajima B6N torpedo bomber attacked the ships but was driven off by heavy anti-aircraft fire. Indiana fired a total of 200 shells from her main battery before poor visibility forced her to cease fire at 15:55. She left the area the next morning and steamed to Ulithi, arriving on 26 January. Badger then transferred to the battleship New Jersey and Indiana occupied herself with anti-aircraft training for the rest of the month.

The ship got underway again on 10 February as part of TG 58.1 for a raid on Tokyo, Japan; a group of carriers launched air strikes on targets in the area on 16 February, followed by a series of strikes on various targets in the Bonin Islands (including Iwo Jima), after which they conducted a second strike on the Tokyo area on 25 February. In addition to providing anti-aircraft defense for the carriers, Indiana also frequently used her Kingfishers to pick up downed aircrews, and on 1 March one of her aircraft picked up the crews of two such aircraft. The fleet returned to Ulithi on 3 March for replenishment. On 14 March, Indiana sortied with South Dakota, Massachusetts, North Carolina, and Washington, now designated TU 58.1.3, to support another round of strikes on Japan that were conducted three days later. She shot down a Japanese aircraft in the early hours of 19 March before the carriers attacked various points on the island of Kyushu. Later that day, the fleet steamed to strike the Kure Naval Arsenal. The carriers Wasp and Franklin were badly damaged by Japanese air attacks and were forced to withdraw.

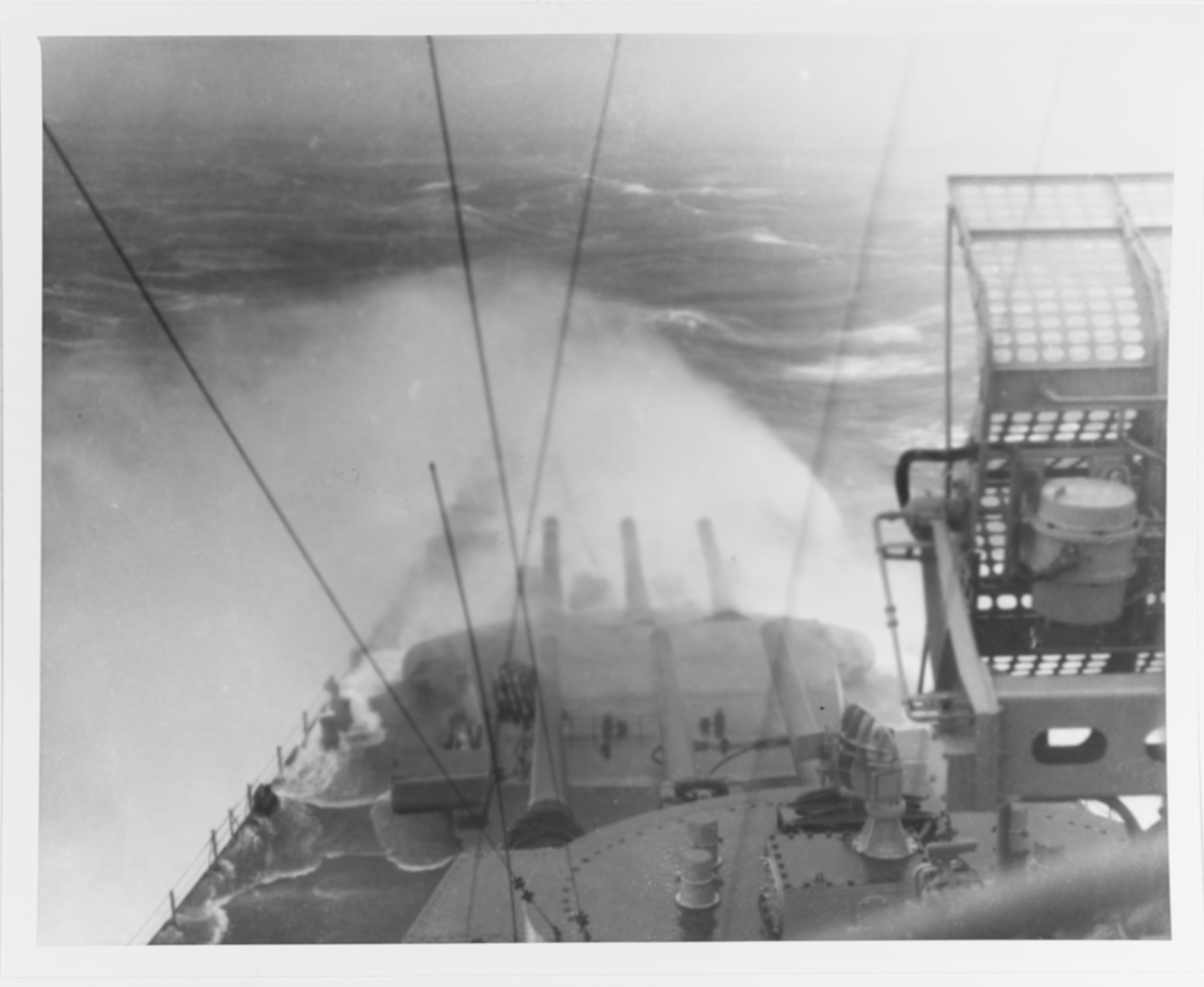
Indiana in heavy seas during the cyclone on 5 June

On 23 March, Indiana steamed to Okinawa to join the preparatory bombardment of the island. She fired 180 main battery shells the next day and then rejoined the fleet. She resumed her air defense role for the next several days while the carriers launched raids on the island. For much of April, Indiana and the rest of TG 58.1 provided support to the marines and soldiers fighting in the Battle of Okinawa. On 7 April, the Japanese launched a major counter-attack on the Allied naval forces, including large-scale kamikaze strikes and Operation Ten-Go with the battleship Yamato, but they were repelled with heavy losses. The kamikaze raids continued throughout the month, and on 12 April two fighters—a Mitsubishi A6M Zero and a Nakajima Ki-43—attempted to crash into Indiana, but her heavy anti-aircraft fire shot both down before they could strike her, though a fragment from one of the kamikazes struck a marine aboard the ship. Two days later, she shot down three more Ki-43s. She accidentally opened fire on a pair of American Grumman F6F Hellcat fighters on 15 April, but did not damage them. Later that day, she met with replenishment oilers to refuel.

The ships of BatDiv 8 left Okinawa at the end of the month and returned to Ulithi, where they remained from 1 to 9 May. Indiana then got underway again to escort aircraft carriers for another series of strikes on Kyushu that began on 12 May. Two days later, she shot down an A6M kamikaze and assisted in the recovery of an F6F pilot who had been shot down by Japanese fire. On 27 May, Third Fleet relieved Fifth Fleet as the operational command, and all of the fleet's task forces and subordinate units were renumbered back to 30-series designations, returning Indiana to TG 38.1. In early June, a powerful cyclone formed in the Philippine Sea and moved north toward Okinawa; it struck Third Fleet on 5 June south of the island. Indiana recorded winds as high as 80 knots (150 km/h; 92 mph), which tore one of her Kingfishers from its catapult and hurled it into the sea. The winds also blew seawater into the ventilation intakes for the engine room, shorting out her switchboard and disabling her steering controls for about forty minutes. Thirty-six ships of the fleet were damaged by the storm, though Indiana only superficially so.

The fleet resumed its normal operations in support of the Okinawa fight on 7 June, including air strikes on Japanese airfields on Kyushu the next day that Indiana supported. With an escort of five destroyers on 9 June, Indiana, Alabama, and Massachusetts steamed to shell Japanese facilities on the island of Minami Daito Jima; they repeated the attack the next day. Indiana was thereafter detached to replenish ammunition and other supplies in San Pedro Bay in the Philippines, arriving there on 11 June.

==== Operations off Japan ====
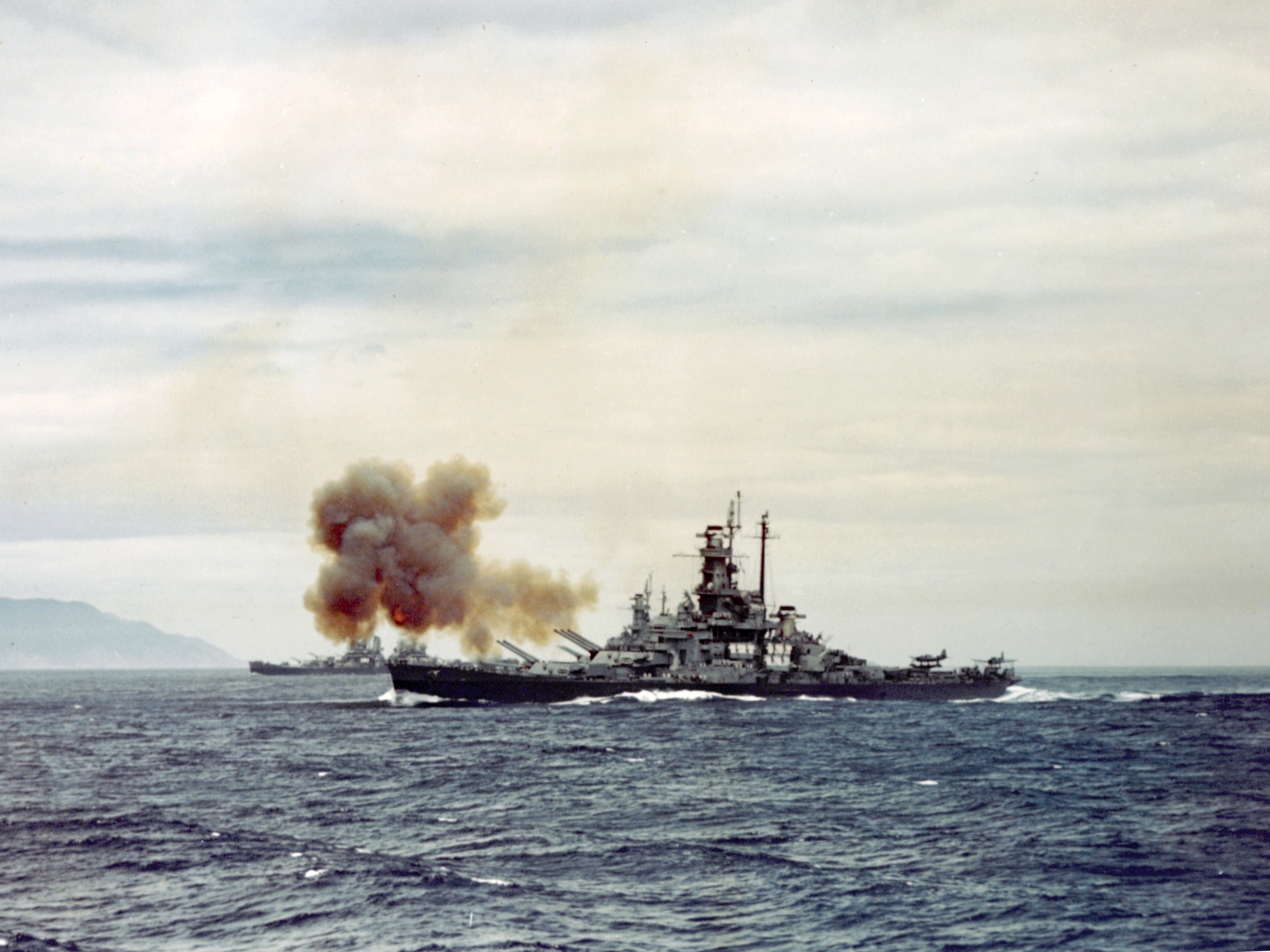
USS Indiana bombarding Kamaishi, Japan, 14 July 1945

Indiana got underway again in early July and returned to TF 38. She supported carrier strikes on the Tokyo area on 10 July and took part in the first bombardment of the Japanese home islands by capital ships during the war. For the attack, which took place on 14 July, Indiana was assigned to TU 34.8.1, which included Massachusetts and South Dakota, the heavy cruisers Chicago and Quincy, and nine destroyers. The primary target was an industrial complex in Kamaishi that included the Japan Iron Co. and the Kamaishi Steel Works. Indiana fired 271 shells from her 16-inch guns, but smoke hindered the efforts of her spotter aircraft from observing the effects of the shooting, though a destroyer returned the next day and reported that fires were still burning. Indiana then resumed her anti-aircraft support duties with the fast carrier task force until being detached for another bombardment operation with TU 34.8.1 on 29 July. This attack, made in concert with the British TF 37—centered on the battleship HMS King George V—targeted industrial facilities at Hamamatsu. Indiana fired 270 shells during the bombardment.

On 1 August, BatDiv 8 was detached to form Support Unit 38.1.2; the ships continued their attacks on coastal cities in company with TF 37. One of Indiana's Kingfishers accidentally crashed in the sea on 7 August, killing its crew. The ships of BatDiv 8 conducted a second attack on Kamaishi on 9 August, with Indiana firing a total of 270 shells between 12:46 and 14:45. Poor visibility again hampered the observers, though this proved to be the ship's last offensive operation. Japan agreed to surrender unconditionally on 15 August while Indiana was en route to the coast to support another wave of carrier strikes. Instead of munitions, food and medical supplies were loaded onto the carriers' aircraft to be dropped on prisoner of war (POW) camps. Indiana contributed a landing party to be sent ashore on 30 August, which was part of the initial occupation forces.

After the formal surrender on 2 September, Indiana steamed into Tokyo Bay on the 5th. Over the course of the next week, Indiana was moored in the harbor and used to process POWs, including 54 USN personnel, 28 marines, 64 civilians, and a number of US Army and Canadian soldiers. On 15 September, she got underway in company with the destroyer Mansfield, bound for California. She was forced to steam at a speed of 18 knots (33 km/h; 21 mph) since her number 3 shaft had locked up and could not be used. On the way, her crew conducted a variety of shooting drills. The two ships reached Pearl Harbor on 22 September before Indiana continued on the next day for San Francisco, which she reached on 29 September. There, she disembarked 1,013 passengers.

=== Postwar ===
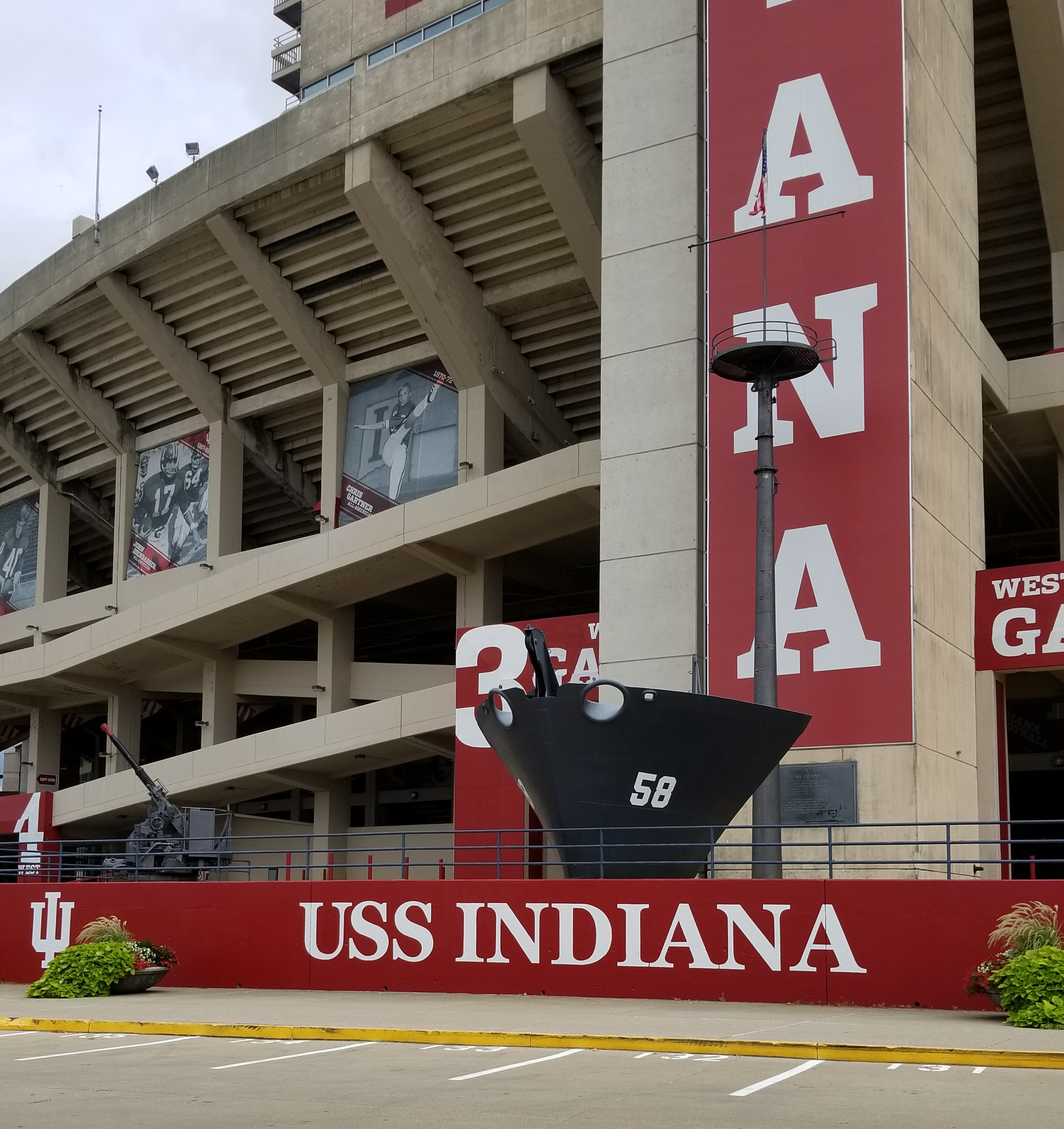
The ship's main mast and prow on display at Memorial Stadium

Indiana immediately went into drydock at Hunters Point Naval Shipyard for repairs lasting until 31 October. From there, she transferred to Puget Sound, where her ammunition and other flammable material was unloaded. She then went into drydock on 15 November to be prepared for deactivation. On 29 March 1946, the Navy announced Postwar Plan Number Two, which detailed the reductions in force necessary to bring the fleet back to a peacetime footing; Indiana was to be transferred to the Pacific Reserve Fleet along with Alabama.

Plans were drawn up during the period she was in reserve to modernize Indiana and the other ships of her class should they be needed for future active service. In March 1954, a program to equip the four ships with secondary batteries consisting of ten twin 3-inch (76 mm) guns were proposed, but the plan came to nothing. Another plan to convert the ship into a guided missile battleship arose in 1956–1957, but the cost of the conversion proved to be prohibitive. She would have had all three main battery turrets removed and replaced with a twin RIM-8 Talos missile launcher forward, two RIM-24 Tartar launchers aft, anti-submarine weapons, and equipment to handle helicopters. The cost of the project amounted to $120 million.

The ships remained laid up in Bremerton, Washington, into the early 1960s; on 27 June 1961, Admiral Arleigh Burke, the Chief of Naval Operations, designated the four South Dakota-class battleships as eligible for disposal, and on 1 May 1962, Fred Korth, the Secretary of the Navy, recommended she be stricken from the Naval Vessel Register effective on 1 June. She was thereafter sold for scrap on 6 September 1963 and broken up.

Several parts of the ship have been preserved in her namesake state, including one of her anchors, which is on display at the Allen County War Memorial Coliseum in Fort Wayne, Indiana; her bell is at the Heslar Naval Armory in Indianapolis, Indiana; her wheel is at Shortridge High School, also in Indianapolis; and her main mast, prow, and a pair of anti-aircraft guns stand on display at Memorial Stadium of Indiana University. The mast and guns had been donated by the Navy in 1966, but her bow section had been kept in California until 2013 when it was moved to Indiana University. Twenty members of the ship's crew attended the dedication ceremony in September 2013. Some of the low-background steel that made up Indiana's hull was recycled to create the low background counting chamber at the in Vivo Radioassay and Research Facility (IVRRF) at Pacific Northwest National Laboratory. A whole-body counter was built utilizing sections cut from her turret armor, weighing in total 65 tons, at Edward Hines Jr. Veterans Administration Hospital between 1964 and 1966.
