= USS South Dakota =

USS South Dakota may refer to:

- USS South Dakota (ACR-9), was a Pennsylvania-class armored cruiser that escorted troops and convoys during World War I
- USS South Dakota (BB-49), was the lead ship of her class of battleship, but canceled before launch
- USS South Dakota (BB-57), was the lead ship of her class of battleship, and saw action during World War II
- USS South Dakota (SSN-790) is a Virginia-class submarine which was christened on 14 October 2017

== See also ==
- South Dakota-class battleship
- South Dakota (disambiguation)
