= Dakota North =

Dakota North may refer to:

- Dakota North (character), a fictional character in the Marvel Comics universe
- Dakota North (speedway rider), Australian motorcycle speedway rider

== See also ==
- North Dakota (disambiguation)
