= Dakota (cigarette) =

R. J. Reynolds Tobacco Company brand

- An old American pack of Dakota cigarettes
- Product type: Cigarette
- Current owner: R. J. Reynolds Tobacco Company
- Produced by: R. J. Reynolds Tobacco Company
- Country: United States
- Introduced: 1990; 36 years ago
- Discontinued: 1990
- Markets: United States, Mexico, Russia
- Tagline: "Smooth. Streetwise", "Smooth revolution", "Smooth action. Slow burn", "Dakota. Where smooth comes easy"

Dakota was an American brand of cigarettes which was owned and manufactured by the R. J. Reynolds Tobacco Company.

== History ==
Dakota was introduced in 1990 and was mainly marketed towards 18 to 24 year old blue-collar "virile females" with no education beyond high school, held entry-level service or factory jobs, had no career prospects, and had a high probability of being unemployed or employed only part time, who wear casual clothes (e.g., jeans, knit tops, sweaters, shorts, warm-up suits, and sweatshirts and sweatpants) and wore little makeup, their taste in television programs included evening soap operas and situation comedies with working-class heroines, such as Roseanne, and their music tastes centered on all-male, classic rock bands, in an attempt to displace the Marlboro brand, without diluting Reynolds' dominant Camel brand's appeal to males.

According to the promotional plan, the virile female spent her free time with her boyfriend, "doing whatever he is doing", aspired to getting married in her early twenties and having a family. She and her friends pursued interests such as "cruising", partying, listening to classic rock and roll, attending various motor sports (e.g., drag races, Hot rod shows, tractor pulls, and motorcycle races), playing softball and bowling, watching wrestling and "Tough Man" competitions, and attending fairs and carnivals. These characteristics were described as "hot buttons" for appealing to the virile female and her friends.

Forty package backgrounds and 40 names for the new brand were tested in Philadelphia, Pennsylvania. Several variations in packaging and product were considered, including a slide box, a foil inner seal, a wider cigarette, and a slower burning cigarette with a higher puff count. Research explored the packaging colors blue, brown, and burgundy. The women in the focus group preferred burgundy, rating the color as "unique/different, attractive, friends would carry, high quality, modern/contemporary". Consumers in Atlanta were the test group for 120 ad concepts for the new brand of cigarettes, and evaluations by consumers in Baltimore, Maryland, were subsequently used to refine 50 ad concepts. The selected set of advertising images was tested with five focus groups of Marlboro smokers in Chicago, Illinois, who were 18 through 20 years old.

After test-marketing in Houston, Tucson, Phoenix, and Nashville, the brand didn't yield the desired results and was eventually withdrawn.

== Controversy ==
=== Dakota and targeting towards "virile women" ===
In February 1990, details of the marketing campaign of the Dakota brand were leaked to The Washington Post and revealed that the cigarettes were narrowly targeted at a demographic described as "virile females". Despite the denial of the R.J. Reynolds Tobacco Company to have specifically targeted young females, this revelation sparked widespread discussion of targeted advertising in general in the media.

== Advertising ==
In the 1990s, R.J. Reynolds made various poster adverts to promote the Dakota brand. The slogan that was used was "Dakota. Where smooth comes easy."

The tested ads seemed successful in conveying the desired imagery of "independent yet approachable, sociable yet also enjoying her own company, feeling equal to men yet enjoying a warm fun relationship with a man" without alienating younger males. Negative reactions to the tested ads occurred either among women with "traditional values" who did not aspire to the "Dakota woman's independence, assertiveness and control" or among the "more conservative/introverted respondents [who] may have felt somewhat threatened by the strong personalities conveyed". Several slogans using "smooth" were tested, including "Smooth. Streetwise", "Smooth revolution" and "Smooth action. Slow burn". "Where smooth comes easy" was preferred for its consistency with the "attitude/personality" of the Dakota woman. Marketing choices emphasized point-of-sale merchandising and materials usable in promotional venues, such as bars. Promotional items considered were door decals, in/out stickers, floormats, change cups, banners, neon signs, counter mats, 3-D (three-dimensional) motion signs, clocks', gas pump toppers, and store hour signs.

Promotional activities for the Dakota brand were intended to be "tightly targeted [and] extremely impactful and [to use] innovative communication techniques". Many promotional concepts were developed, corresponding to the many hot buttons and interests of the targeted women. One proposal was a "Night of the Living Hunks" contest, for which the prize was a date with a male stripper. The targeted women's interest in romance suggested a soap opera trivia contest and free copies of a customized Dakota romance novel in exchange for redeemable one-pack coupons. Other ideas included limousine parties, vouchers for car shows, and parties in large parking lots where participants could pose against a Dakota backdrop while a camera generated poster-sized pictures. "Party packages" custom designed for women's "hot spots" (e.g., bowling alleys, bars, apartments, and company picnics) were also proposed. Packages would include decorations, games, prizes, supplies, and samples of Dakota cigarettes.

Detailed tactical plans and budgets were developed for several promotions related to the targeted women's inclination to patronize bars with rock and roll music. Participating bars and clubs would receive a video jukebox featuring the Dakota colors and logo. An all-male rock band would be named Dakota and perform at local clubs surrounded by a large Dakota banner. The band's clothing, stage materials, and limousine all would bear the Dakota logo. Women in the audience could receive, in a special Dakota folder, instant photographs of themselves with the band. Cassettes of the Dakota band would be handed out with a sweepstakes form to collect names for a direct-mail list; winners would have pictures taken with the band, would be given clothing with the Dakota logo, and would be "official Dakota Groupies for a night". Auditions would be held for a girl singer to perform as guest artist; posters in clubs, newspaper ads, and direct mail would publicize this competition. Dakota would conduct screen tests for five finalists to appear in a "feature role" in a music video of the band. Registration, which would be conducted in clubs, required that another person, such as a friend, sign up screen test participants so that both names could be captured for mailing lists. A "Rock Until You Drop" event was to be publicized by a local radio station and hosted by its disc jockey. Two stages would allow for continuous music, and Dakota samples would be distributed during the event. Before this mega Battle of the Bands event, Dakota parties in nightclubs would award free tickets, limousines, and drinks to selected entrants. All entries would provide names and addresses for the mailing list. Implementation in test markets called for weekly distribution of 500 T-shirts, 30 jackets, 1,000 Polaroid photographs and folders, 250 cassettes, 200 sweepstakes forms, and 250 posters to support the planned events. Implementation also called for neon bar signs, as well as Dakota logos on napkins, coasters, stirrers, table tents, ashtrays, and mirrors.

The total development costs were considerable. Even six months before the scheduled Spring 1990 test marketing and before costs were incurred for ads or promotions, the cost of the project had exceeded $1.4 million. In addition, the campaign may have had some public relations costs for the industry. A sizable advocacy campaign was mounted to highlight the targeting and promotion efforts (USDHHS 2000). The effect of the advocacy effort is unclear, but the Dakota brand ultimately had little market impact, and it was withdrawn. The campaign illustrated that psychological subtleties and knowledge of lifestyle patterns were used to define women precisely and that risks from positioning the brand narrowly existed, in that it may have resulted in disinterest among consumers outside this narrow lifestyle segment.

== See also ==
- Tobacco smoking
