= Dakota =

Dakota may refer to:

- Dakota people, a sub-tribe of the Sioux
  - Dakota language, their language

Dakota may also refer to:

== Places ==
=== United States ===
- Dakota, Georgia, an unincorporated community
- Dakota, Illinois, a town
- Dakota, Minnesota, a city
- Dakota, Wisconsin, a town
  - Dakota (community), Wisconsin, an unincorporated community
- Dakota City, Iowa
- Dakota City, Nebraska
- Dakota County, Minnesota
- Dakota County, Nebraska
  - Dakota Formation, a North American geologic unit named for the county
- The Dakotas, a collective term for the states of North and South Dakota
- Dakota Territory (1861–1889)
- Department of Dakota (1866–1911), an administrative district of the U.S. Army

=== Elsewhere ===
- Dacota, also spelt Dakota, a town in Aruba

== People ==
- Dakota (given name)
- Dakota (singer), a British singer
- Dakota, a pseudonym of German trance music DJ and producer Markus Schulz
- Rita Dakota, Belarusian singer-songwriter
- Dakota Kai, former WWE fighter Cheree Georgina "Charlie" Crowley

== Arts and entertainment ==
- Dakota North (character), Marvel Comics character
- Dakota (2022 film), a 2022 film starring Abbie Cornish
- Dakota (1988 film), a 1988 film starring Lou Diamond Phillips
- Dakota (1974 film), a 1974 film starring Kees Brusse
- Dakota (1945 film), a 1945 film starring John Wayne
- Dakota (novel), a 2008 book by Martha Grimes
- Dakota (band), an American melodic rock band
- "Dakota" (song), a 2005 UK #1 song by Stereophonics

== Brands ==
- Dakota (cigarette), a brand
- Ritz Dakota Digital, a camera

== Sports ==
- Dakota Bowl, a championship weekend for North Dakota high school football
- SV Dakota, an Aruban football club

== Transportation ==
=== Air ===
- Dakota, a military version of the Douglas DC-3
  - Dakota II, Royal Air Force designation of impressed Douglas DC-3 aircraft
  - Douglas C-47 Skytrain or Dakota, a military transport aircraft
- Variants of the Piper Cherokee light aircraft:
  - Dakota, Piper Dakota model PA-28-236
  - Dakota, Piper Turbo Dakota model PA-28-201T

=== Land ===
- Dakota MRT station, a Mass Rapid Transit Station in Paya Lebar, Singapore
- Dodge Dakota, light truck
  - Shelby Dakota, a limited-production performance version of the Dodge Dakota Sport pickup truck

=== Water ===
- SS Dakota (1877), a British passenger steamship that sank off the coast of Anglesey, Wales in 1877
- SS Dakota, an American ocean liner that sank off Yokohama in 1907

== Other uses ==
- Dakota (fossil), a mummified hadrosaur fossil
- The Dakota, New York City apartment building
- Dakota (Warrenton, Virginia), a historic house
- Dakota Jazz Club, Twin Cities, Minnesota

== See also ==
- North Dakota, a U.S. state
- South Dakota, a U.S. state
- The Dakotas (disambiguation)
- Dakota War of 1862, a conflict between the US and bands of Eastern Sioux
- Lost Dakota, a small, remote exclave of Dakota Territory
