= South Dakota-class battleship (1939) =

Fast battleship class of the United States Navy

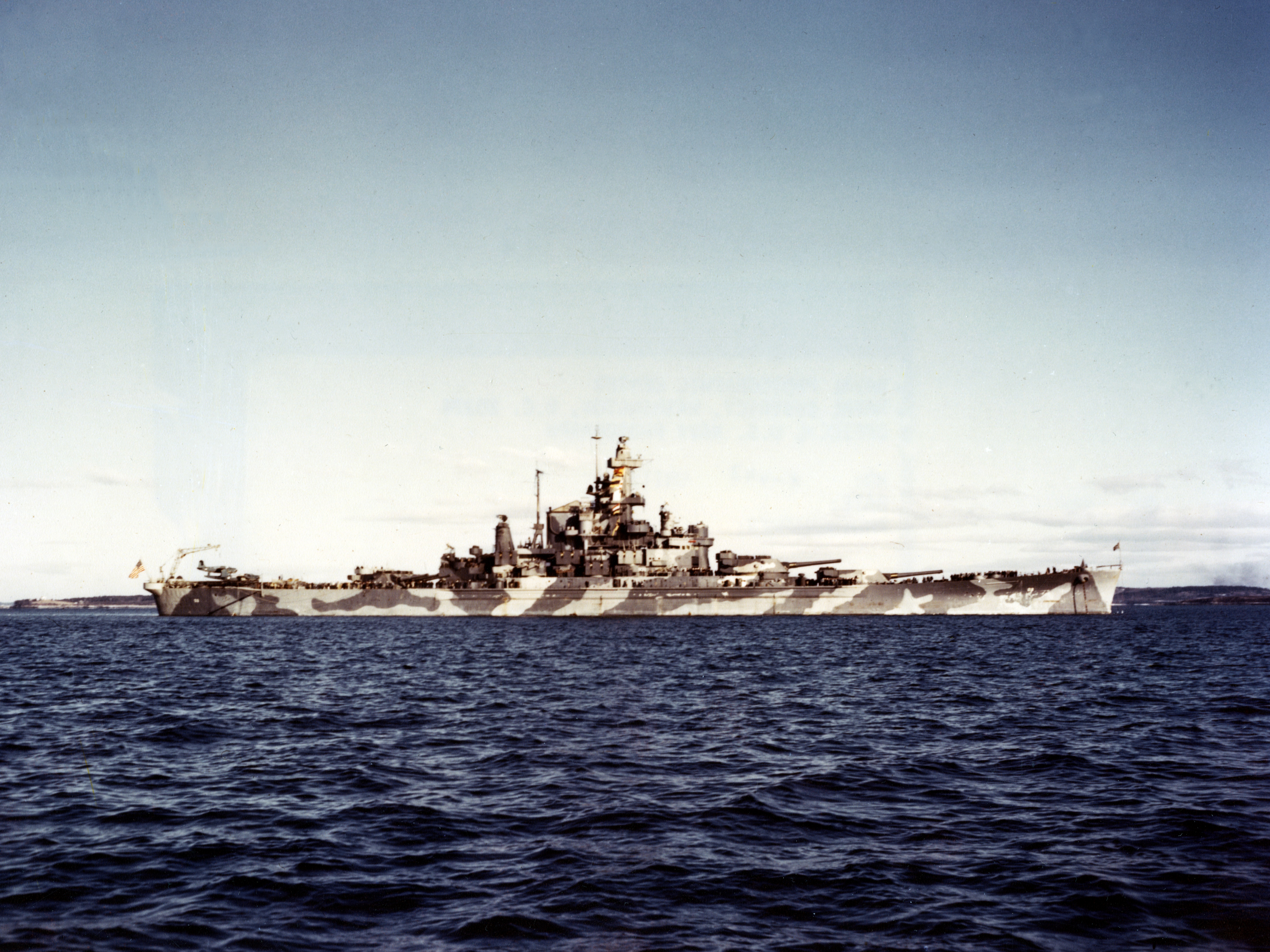
- Alabama in Casco Bay, Maine, circa December 1942

Class overview
- Name: South Dakota class
- Builders: New York Shipbuilding Corporation; Newport News Shipbuilding; Bethlehem, Fore River Shipyard; Norfolk Naval Shipyard
- Operators: United States Navy
- Preceded by: North Carolina class
- Succeeded by: Iowa class
- Built: 1939–1942
- In commission: 1942–1947
- Completed: 4
- Retired: 4
- Scrapped: 2
- Preserved: 2

General characteristics
- Type: Fast battleship
- Displacement: 35,412 long tons (35,980 t) (standard); 44,519 long tons (45,233 t) (1942 full load)
- Length: 666 ft (203 m) (waterline); 680 ft (207 m) (o/a)
- Beam: 108 ft 2 in (33 m)
- Draft: 36 ft 2 in (11 m)
- Installed power: 8 × water-tube boilers; 130,000 shp (97,000 kW)
- Propulsion: 4 × screws; 4 × geared steam turbines
- Speed: 27.5 knots (50.9 km/h; 31.6 mph)
- Range: 15,000 nmi (28,000 km; 17,000 mi) at 15 knots (28 km/h; 17 mph)
- Complement: 1,793–2,634
- Sensors & processing systems: SC radar; SK radar; SR radar (South Dakota, Indiana and Alabama)
- Armament: 3 × triple 16 in (406 mm) guns; 16 or 20 × 5 in (127 mm) DP guns; 76 × 40 mm (1.6 in) AA guns; 67 × single 20 mm (0.8 in) AA guns
- Armor: Belt 12.2 in (310 mm); Bulkheads 11.3 in (287 mm); Barbettes: 11.3–17.3 in (287–439 mm); Turrets: 18 in (457 mm); Conning tower 16 in (406 mm); Decks 1.5 in (38 mm), 5.75–6.05 in (146–154 mm), 0.63–1 in (16–25 mm)
- Aircraft carried: 2 × OS2U Kingfisher floatplanes
- Aviation facilities: 1 × aircraft catapult

The South Dakota class was a group of four fast battleships built by the United States Navy. They were the second class of battleships to be named after the 40th state; the first were designed in the 1920s and canceled under the terms of the Washington Naval Treaty. Four ships comprised the class: South Dakota, Indiana, Massachusetts, and Alabama. They were designed to the same treaty standard displacement limit of 35,000 long tons (35,600 t) as the preceding North Carolina class and had the same main battery of nine 16"/45 caliber Mark 6 guns in three-gun turrets, but were more compact and better protected. The ships can be visually distinguished from the earlier vessels by their single funnel, compared to twin funnels in the North Carolinas.

Construction began shortly before World War II, with Fiscal Year (FY) 1939 appropriations. Commissioning through the summer of 1942, the four ships served in both the Atlantic, ready to intercept possible German capital ship sorties, and the Pacific, in carrier groups and shore bombardments. All four ships were retired shortly after World War II; South Dakota and Indiana were scrapped in the 1960s, Massachusetts and Alabama were retained as museum ships.

== Development ==
=== Background ===
The preceding two North Carolina-class battleships had been assigned to the FY1937 building program, and in 1936, the General Board met to discuss the two battleships to be allocated to FY1938. The General Board argued for two more North Carolinas, but Admiral William H. Standley, the Chief of Naval Operations, wanted the ships to be of a new design. That meant construction could not begin by 1938, so the ships were assigned to FY1939. Design work started in March 1937 and the draft for two battleships was formally approved by the Secretary of the Navy on 23 June. More specific characteristics for the two ships were ironed out, and those were approved on 4 January 1938. The ships were formally ordered on 4 April 1938.

Due to the deteriorating international situations in Europe and Asia, Congress authorized a further two battleships of the new design, for a total of four, under the Deficiency Authorization of 25 June 1938. The "Escalator Clause" of the Second London Naval Treaty had been activated in the U.S. Navy so it could begin work on the follow-on Iowa-class battleships, but Congress was willing to approve only the 35,000-ton battleships. (Note: The tonnage here refers to standard displacement. Also known as "Washington displacement", standard displacement is a specific term defined by the Washington Naval Treaty of 1922. It is the displacement of the ship complete, fully manned, engined, and equipped ready for sea, including all armament and ammunition, equipment, outfit, provisions and fresh water for crew, miscellaneous stores, and implements of every description that are intended to be carried in war, but without fuel or reserve boiler feed water on board.) A number of deficiencies in the preceding North Carolinas were to be fixed in the South Dakotas; these included insufficient underwater protection and turbine engines not of the most recent technology. The North Carolinas also did not have sufficient space to act as fleet flagships, so the lead ship of the new class was designed with an extra deck on the conning tower specifically for this purpose, although the increase in space and weight from this necessitated removal of two twin 5-inch dual-purpose (DP) gun mounts.

=== Design ===
There was a great deal of debate on the requirements for the new battleships. The design board drew up a number of proposals; one called for a ship with nine 16-inch (406 mm) guns in three triple turrets, 5.9-inch-thick (150 mm) deck armor that would have made the ship immune to plunging fire out to 30,000 yards (27,000 m), and a top speed of at least 23 knots (43 km/h; 26 mph). The belt armor was a much more intractable problem; the 16-inch gun could penetrate 13.5 inches (340 mm) of plate, the thickest in an American battleship at the time, even at 25,000 yd (23,000 m). To proof the ship against her own armament—a characteristic known as "balanced armor"—the main belt would have to be increased to 15.5 in (390 mm), which would have increased the weight of the vessel to prohibitive levels. To mitigate this problem, sloped armor was proposed; it was infeasible to use inclined armor in an external belt, because it would compromise stability to a dangerous degree. Instead, an internal armor belt was constructed behind unarmored hull plates. This had serious drawbacks, however; it complicated the construction process, and if the armored belt was damaged, the external plating would have to be cut away first before the belt could be repaired.

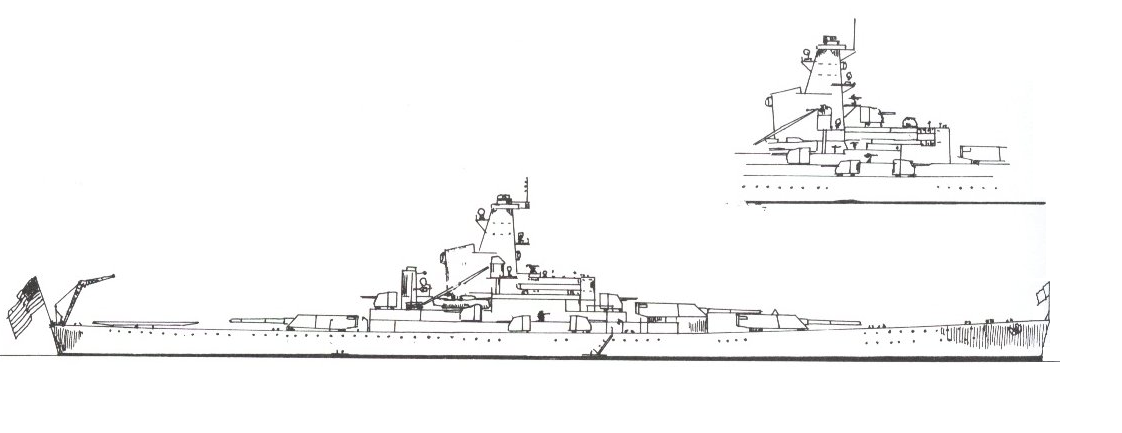
A preliminary design of the South Dakota class

To minimize the drawbacks of the inclined belt, it sloped outward from the keel, then back in towards the armored deck. This meant that shells fired at relatively close range would hit the upper portion of the belt at an angle, which maximized armor protection. However, the effectiveness of the upper portion of the belt was degraded at longer ranges, because plunging fire would strike it at an angle closer to the perpendicular, increasing their ability to penetrate the armor. It did reduce the area that needed to be covered by the armored deck, which saved additional weight. This enabled the upper belt to be thicker, which to an extent ameliorated the vulnerability to plunging fire. Because the belt was internal, it provided the opportunity to extend it to the inner portion of the double bottom, which gave the ship better underwater protection than the North Carolinas. Ultimately, the complex double incline belt armor was abandoned when it became apparent that a single slanted belt could provide similar protection, and save several hundred tons of weight.

The size of the hull was also a problem: a longer hull generally equates to a higher top speed, but requires more armor to protect it. In order to keep a higher top speed on a shorter hull, higher-performance machinery is required. Since the South Dakota design was much shorter than the preceding North Carolinas—680 ft (207.3 m) compared to 729 ft (222.2 m), respectively—the new ships would need improved machinery than would otherwise have been used in shorter hulls in order to retain the same speed as the longer ships. The design initially called for a top speed of at least 22.5 knots (41.7 km/h; 25.9 mph), which was deemed sufficient to keep up with opposing battleships and outrun surfaced submarines. However, in late 1936, cryptanalysts deciphered radio traffic from the Japanese navy which revealed that the battleship Nagato was capable of speeds in excess of 26 knots (48 km/h).

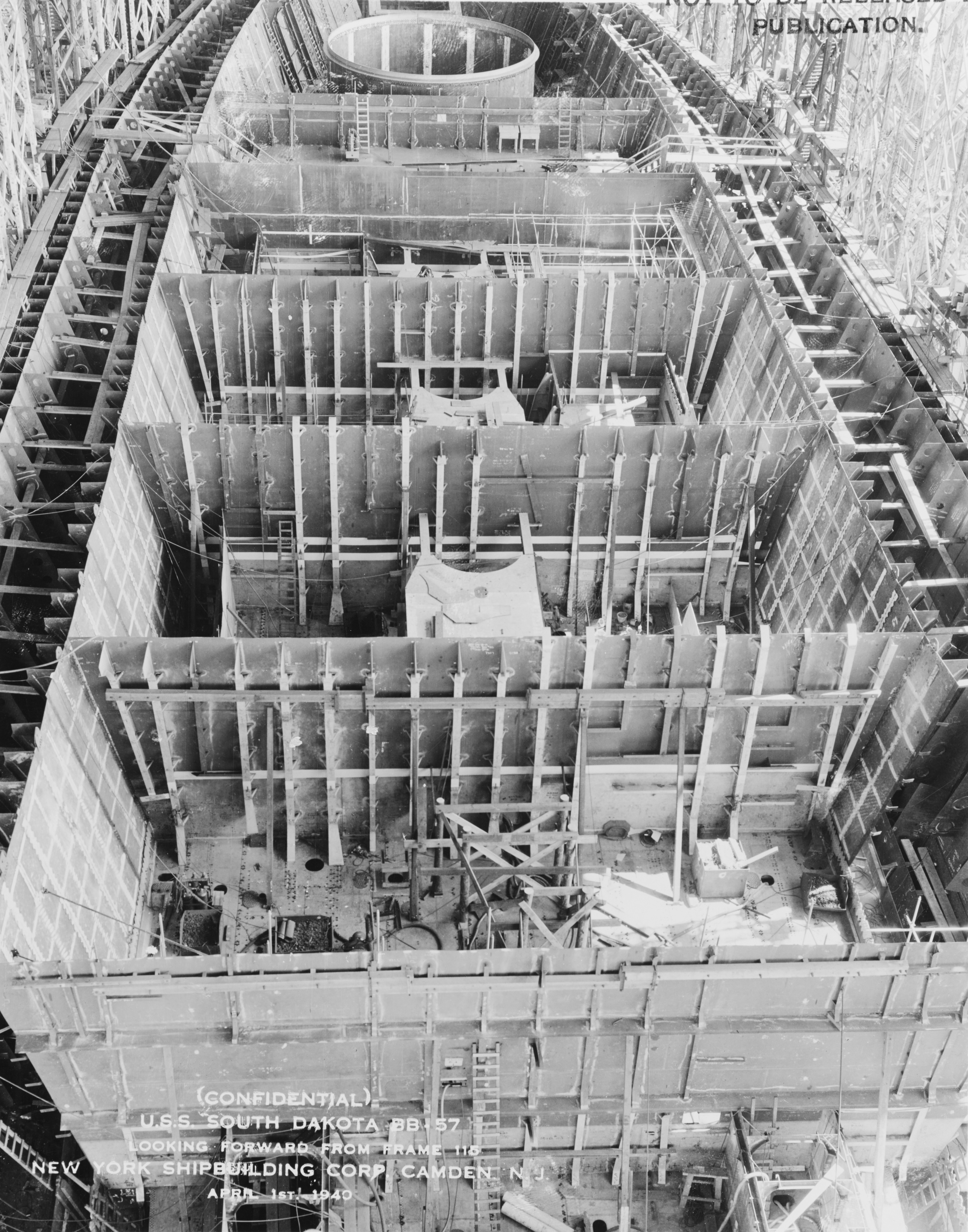
South Dakota under construction in April 1940

To counter this, it was determined a top speed of 25.8–26.2 kn (47.8–48.5 km/h; 29.7–30.2 mph) was possible if the power plant from North Carolina could be reduced in size enough to fit in the tighter hull of South Dakota. In order to do so the boilers were positioned directly above the turbines in the same arrangement to have been used in the 1916 Lexington-class battlecruisers. The boilers were then rearranged several times so they were staggered with the turbines, eventually ending directly alongside the turbines. The propulsion system was arranged as close together as possible, and the evaporators and distilling equipment were placed in the machinery rooms. This provided enough additional space behind the armored belt to add a second plotting room.

By this time, the design process had established that the hull was to be 666 ft long (203 m) between perpendiculars and incorporate the single internal sloped armor belt. However, in case of rejection by the General Board, naval architects produced a series of alternatives. Among these were longer, faster ships armed with 14-inch guns in triple turrets, slower ships with 14-inch guns in quadruple turrets, improved versions of the North Carolina class, and a ship of 27 knots (50 km/h) armed with nine 16-in guns in a similar configuration to the North Carolinas.

Arguments arose, frequently over the issue of speed; the Commander in Chief, United States Fleet (CINCUS) refused to allow the new ship to drop below 25 knots (46 km/h; 29 mph), the Battle Force argued at least 27 knots (50 km/h; 31 mph) was necessary to maintain homogeneity in the line of battle, and the president of the War College maintained a fast ship was optimal, but the navy would continue to operate the older 21 knots (39 km/h; 24 mph) battleships until the 1950s and so a higher speed was not strictly necessary—though, crucially, it would mean the class would have been too slow to act in what would emerge as the most critical role for battleships, as escorts for fast carrier task forces. The primary 666-ft design was the only plan that could meet the specified requirements for speed, protection, and the nine 16-inch guns. By late 1937 a proposed design was agreed on, requiring only small modifications to save weight and increase the fields of fire. Berths for the crew, even the staterooms for senior officers, along with mess halls were reduced in size, and ventilation ports were completely removed, forcing the ship to rely completely on artificial air circulation.

Despite the compromises made, naval historians William Garzke and Robert Dulin would later argue that the South Dakota-class ships were the best treaty battleships ever built. The naval historian Norman Friedman stated that the South Dakota design was "a remarkable achievement within very constricting treaty limits." Moreover the final commitment to a higher speed presaged the development of the subsequent Iowa class—the largest, fastest, and final U.S. battleships. As Friedman has written:

For half a century prior to laying the Iowa class down, the U.S. Navy had consistently advocated armor and firepower at the expense of speed. Even in adopting fast battleships of the North Carolina class, it had preferred the slower of two alternative designs. Great and expensive improvements in machinery design had been used to minimize the increased power on the designs rather than make extraordinary powerful machinery (hence much higher speed) practical. Yet the four largest battleships the U.S. Navy produced were not much more than 33-knot versions of the 27-knot, 35,000 tonners that had preceded them. The Iowas showed no advance at all in protection over the South Dakotas. The principal armament improvement was a more powerful 16-inch gun, 5 calibers longer. Ten thousand tons was a very great deal to pay for 6 knots.

== Specifications ==
=== General characteristics ===
The South Dakota–class battleships were 666 ft (203 m) long at the waterline, 680 ft (207.3 m) overall, and 108 ft 2 in (32.97 m) in beam. (Note: The individual ships dimensions varied slightly from design values. For example, South Dakota herself had a waterline length of 666 ft (203.0 m), an overall length of 680 ft 4.25 in (207.4 m), and beam of 108 ft 1.5 in (33.0 m).) The design standard displacement was 35,412 long tons (35,980 t), approximately 1.2% overweight; when the ships were commissioned in 1942, the considerable increase in anti-air armament from the contract design increased standard displacement to 37,682 long tons (38,287 t) (Indiana's calculated value on 12 April 1942). Full load displacement was 44,519 long tons (45,233 t) when commissioned, with a mean draft of 34 ft 11.25 in (10.6 m) at this displacement. At the design combat displacement of 42,545 long tons (43,228 t), the mean draft was 33 ft 9.813 in (10.3 m) while metacentric height was 7.18 ft (2.2 m). The addition of more anti-aircraft mounts during the ships' service in World War II increased the full load displacement considerably towards the end of the war; by 1945, South Dakota's full load displacement was some 46,200 long tons (46,900 t), and Massachusetts reached up to 47,006 long tons (47,760 t) at emergency load.

The hull featured a bulbous bow, triple bottom under the armored citadel, and skegs, characteristics shared by all American fast battleships. Unlike the preceding North Carolina-class and the subsequent Iowa-class, the South Dakotas mounted the outboard propulsion shafts in skegs rather than the inboard ones. Compared to the North Carolinas, the slightly shorter hull form resulted in improved maneuverability, and the vibration problems had been considerably reduced.

=== Armament ===
==== Main battery ====
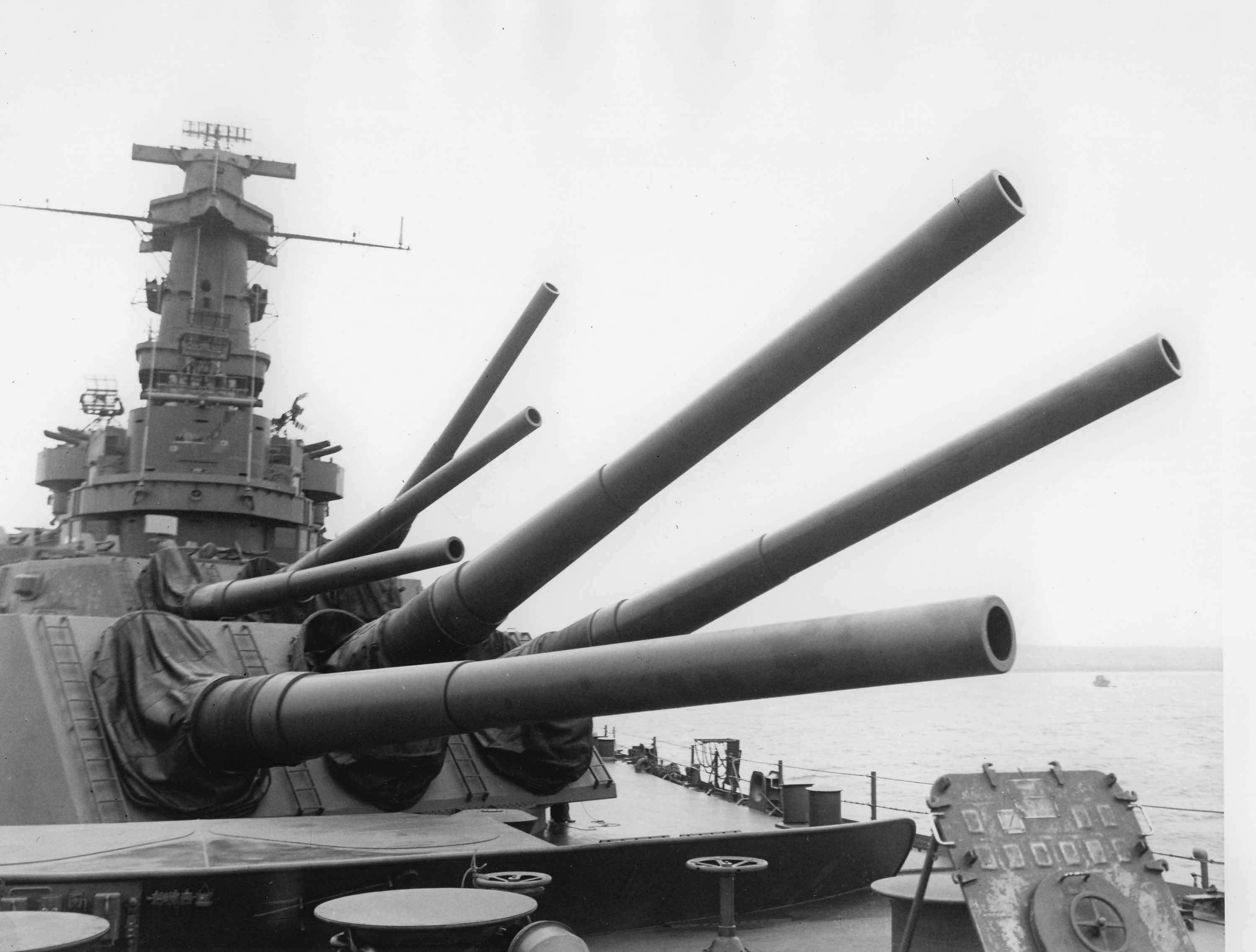
South Dakota shows the range of independent elevation of her main guns

The South Dakota–class battleships carried a main battery of nine 16 inches (406 mm)/45 caliber Mark 6 guns in three three-gun turrets, identical to the North Carolina-class. Two of these turrets were placed in a superfiring pair forward; the third turret was mounted aft of the main superstructure. These guns fired a 2,700 lb (1,200 kg) Mark 8 armor-piercing (AP) shell at a rate of two per minute per gun. The guns could either use a full propellant charge of 535 lb (243 kg), a reduced charge of 295 lb (134 kg), or a reduced flashless charge of 315 lb (143 kg). This provided a muzzle velocity of 2,300 feet per second (700 metres per second) for the AP shell with the full propellant charge, while the reduced version provided a correspondingly lower muzzle velocity of 1,800 ft/s (550 m/s). 130 shells were stowed for each gun, which came to a total of 1,170. The guns in all three turrets could elevate to 45 degrees, but only I and III turrets could depress to −2 degrees; the superfiring II turret was not able to depress. This enabled a maximum range of 36,900 yards (33,700 m) with the Mark 8 projectile. The turrets were able to train 150 degrees in both directions from the centerline, which enabled a wide arc of fire. The guns could be elevated or depressed at a rate of 12 degrees per second, and the turrets could train at 4 degrees per second.

==== Secondary battery ====
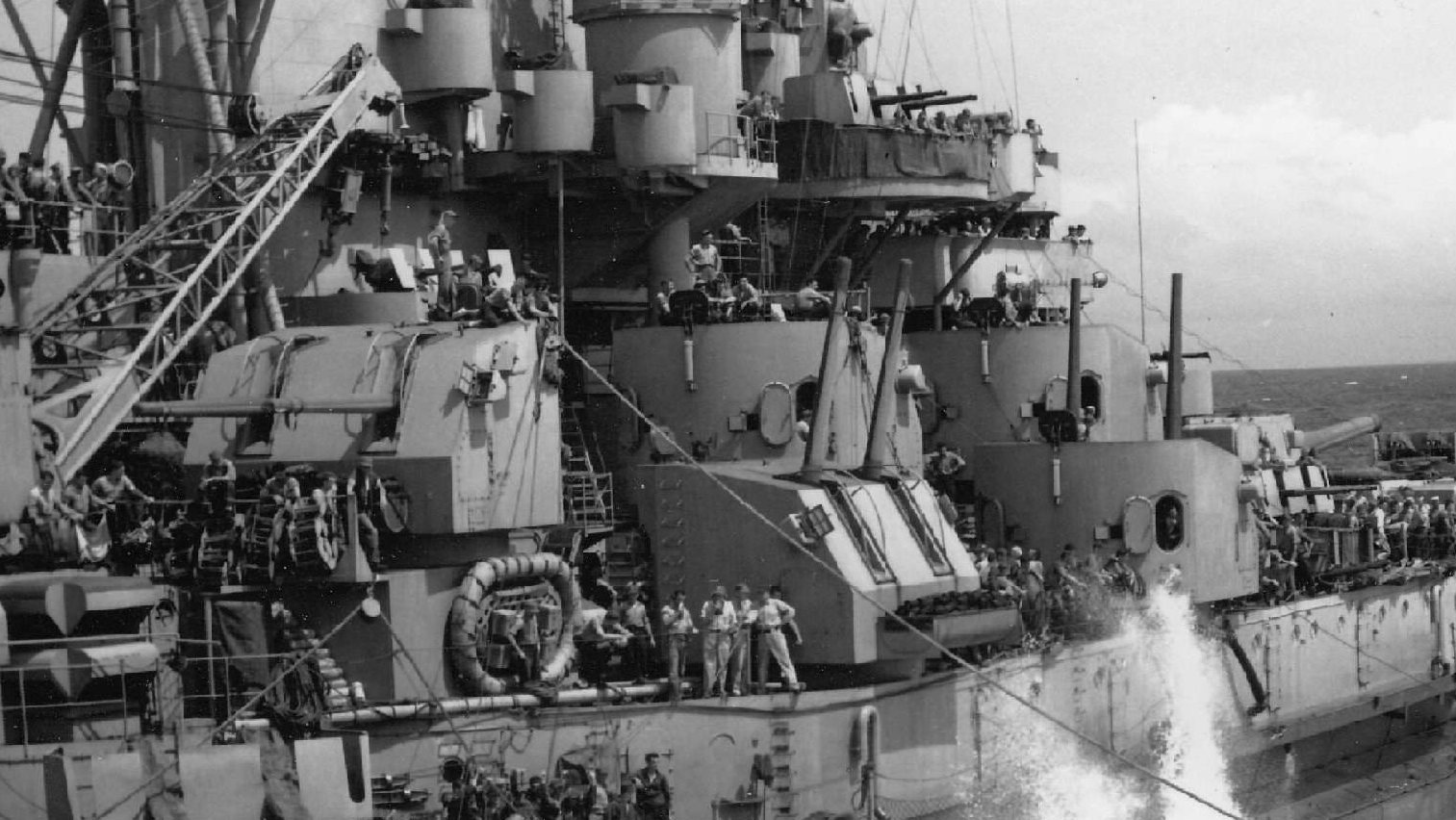
Massachusetts' 5-inch gun battery

South Dakota was built as a fleet flagship, with an extra deck on her conning tower for extra command space, so her secondary battery had sixteen 5-inch (127 mm)/38 caliber Mark 12 guns in eight Mark 28 Mod 0 twin dual-purpose (DP) mounts, four on either side of the superstructure. This was two turrets fewer than her sister ships who had ten twin DP mounts of twenty guns, five on either side of the ship. These turrets weighed 156,295 lb (70,894 kg) and could depress their guns to −15 degrees and elevate them to 85 degrees. The guns fired a variety of different projectiles, including anti-aircraft (AA), illumination, and white phosphorus (WP) shells, at a rate of fire of 15–22 rounds per minute. The AA shells were 20.75 in long (52.7 cm) and weighed between 54 and 55 lb (24–25 kg), depending on the variant. The illumination and white phosphorus shells were slightly smaller, at 20 in (51 cm) long; the illumination rounds weighed 54.4 lb (24.7 kg) and the WP shells were 53 lb (24 kg).

The guns used three different charges, depending on the situation: a full charge, a full flashless charge, and a reduced charge. The standard full charge weighed 15.2–15.5 lb (6.9–7.0 kg), the flashless charge was slightly heavier at 16 lb (7.3 kg), and the reduced charge was significantly smaller, at 3.6 lb (1.6 kg). Both full charges provided a muzzle velocity of 2,600 ft/s (790 m/s) in new guns, but as continued fire wore down the barrels, muzzle velocity degraded slightly, to 2,500 ft/s (760 m/s). The reduced charge's muzzle velocity was correspondingly lower, at 1,200 ft/s (370 m/s). Each gun was supplied with 450 rounds, and was expected to fire 4,600 shells before it was worn enough to warrant replacement. At the maximum effective elevation to engage surface targets, 45 degrees, the guns could hit targets up to 17,392 yards (15,903 m) away. The maximum height at which aircraft could be engaged was 37,200 feet (11,300 m).

==== Anti-aircraft battery ====
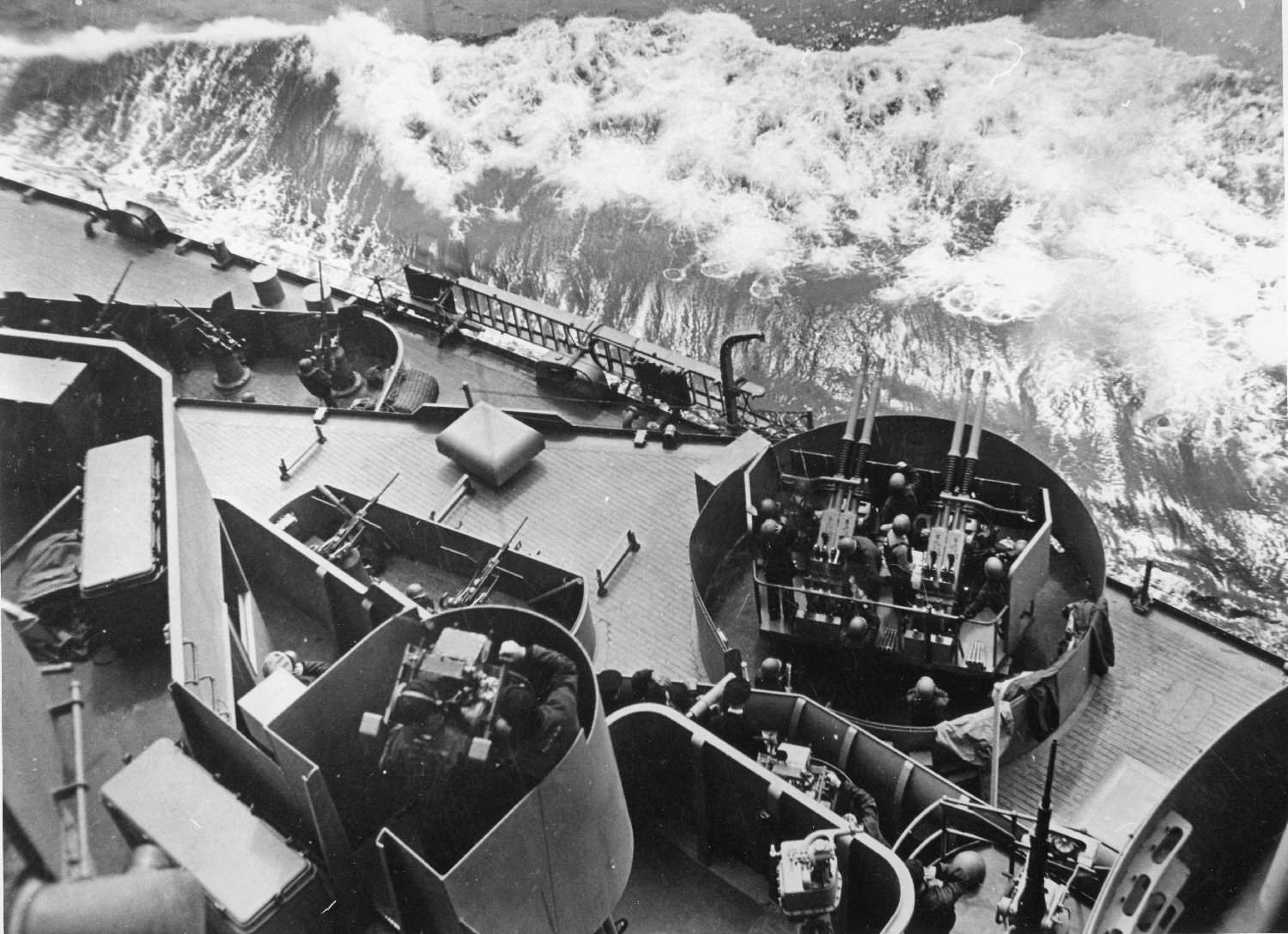
A variety of anti-aircraft weapons on board South Dakota

The ships had a variety of anti-aircraft weapons, and the weapons mounted changed over time. Initially, the ships were designed to mount twelve .50 in (12.7 mm) machine guns and twelve 1.1 in (27.9 mm) autocannon. By March 1942, when South Dakota was completed, the anti-aircraft battery was modified to eight .50-inch and twenty-eight 1.1-inch machine guns and sixteen 20 mm (1 in) Oerlikon autocannon. In September of that year, the .50-inch guns were removed and the number of 1.1-inch guns reduced to 20. In their place, the 20mm guns were increased to 16 weapons, and 16 40 mm (1.6 in) Bofors guns were added, in four quadruple mounts.

In February 1943, the 1.1-inch guns and 1 Oerlikon gun were replaced with an additional 52 Bofors guns, for a total of 68. In December 1944, the battery was again upgraded, with 72 Oerlikon and 72 Bofors guns. In March 1945, the battery was modified for the last time: 5 Oerlikon were added and 4 Bofors were removed. This provided the maximum number of anti-aircraft guns, at 145 guns. The other three ships followed a similar pattern of upgrades to the anti-aircraft armament.

=== Propulsion ===
The South Dakotas had eight Babcock & Wilcox three-drum express type boilers that had a steam pressure of 600 psi (4,100 kPa) and a temperature of 850 °F (454 °C). The steam drove four geared turbines, one for each propeller shaft. General Electric provided the turbines for the South Dakota and the Massachusetts, while identical machinery for Indiana and Alabama were provided by Westinghouse. Similar to the North Carolina-class, the machinery was divided into four machinery spaces, each with two boilers and one set of turbines in order to ensure isolation of main propulsion machinery. No longitudinal bulkheads were fitted in the machinery spaces; this was to reduce the risk of asymmetric flooding and capsizing.

The vessels had four screws, with the two outboard screws mounted in skegs. Two semi-balanced rudders were mounted behind the two inboard screws. As completed, the ships had all four-bladed propellers, but vibration tests would result in the ships of the class having different propeller blade arrangements throughout the war. Massachusetts and Alabama had five blades in the outboard propellers and four blades inboard, while Indiana had three blades inboard. The power output was 130,000 shp (97,000 kW), while overloading permitted up to 135,000 shp (101,000 kW), which drove the ships at a design speed of 27.5 knots (50.9 km/h; 31.6 mph). The displacement of the vessels gradually increased over World War II, mainly due to additional light anti-aircraft gun placements and greater fuel oil carriage to refuel smaller escorts. By 1945, Alabama achieved 27.08 knots (50.2 km/h; 31.2 mph) at 42,740 long tons (43,430 t) on 133,070 shp (99,230 kW). The ships carried about 6,600 long tons (6,700 t) of fuel oil, which gave a range of 15,000 nmi (28,000 km; 17,000 mi) at 15 knots (28 km/h; 17 mph).

Each ship had seven 1,000 kW ship service turbogenerators (SSTG) as well as two 200 kW emergency diesel generators. Total electrical power output was 7,000 kW at 450 volts alternating current.

=== Electronics ===
The South Dakotas were able to reap the benefits of developments in radar technology during World War II. By the end of the war, the ships were equipped with air and surface-search radars and radar fire-control. When commissioned, the ships were equipped with the SC air-search radar. This radar would eventually get replaced by the SK and SK-2 air-search radar. The main battery directors were fitted with Mark 3 fire-control radar, which were replaced by the Mark 8 starting in 1942. This radar gave these ships a significant advantage over ships of the Imperial Japanese Navy, which for the most part relied on optical systems.

The Mark 37 directors for the secondary batteries were fitted with the Mark 4 radar. With this system and the VT fused shells, the secondary batteries became formidable anti-air weapons, as well as being capable of use against surface targets. The Mark 4 was eventually replaced by the Mark 12/22.

=== Armor ===
Unlike the preceding North Carolina-class battleships, the South Dakotas were designed to be resistant against 16-inch shellfire. The protection zone against the 2,240 lb projectile fired by the 16-inch/45 cal. guns of the Colorado class was 17,700 to 30,900 yd (16.2 to 28.3 km). To remain within treaty displacement limits, the belt armor was only slightly thicker while being considerably more inclined; this necessitating an internal belt arrangement in order to retain adequate waterline beam for stability. The immune zone of the side armor against the 16-inch guns used by the South Dakotas themselves was smaller due to the introduction of the 2,700 lbs Mark 8 Super Heavy shell; against such a shell, the armor was effective only at ranges between 20,500 and 26,400 yd (18.7 and 24.1 km).

Abreast of the 1.25-inch (32 mm) Special Treatment Steel (STS) outer hull plating, the South Dakotas' internal armor belt consists of 12.2-inch (310 mm) thick Class A Krupp cemented (K.C.) armor mounted on 0.875-inch (22 mm) thick STS plate, and was inclined 19° from the vertical. This was equal to 17.3 inches (440 mm) of vertical belt armor at 19,000 yards (9.4 nmi; 17 km). The belt armor extended to the triple bottom with a Class B homogeneous Krupp-type lower belt and tapered from its maximum thickness of 12.2 inches (310 mm) down to 1 inch (25 mm) at the lowest portion at the triple bottom. This feature was chosen to protect against penetration of heavy-caliber gun projectiles that managed to hit the ship below the waterline. The ends of the armored citadel are protected by 11.3-inch (287 mm) thick traverse bulkheads. The horizontal deck protection is made of three layers: a 1.5-inch (38 mm) STS weather deck (also called "bomb deck"), a combined 5.75–6.05-inch (146–154 mm) Class B and STS second deck, and a 0.625-inch (16 mm) STS splinter deck over the machinery spaces. Over the magazines, the splinter deck is replaced with a 1-inch (25 mm) STS third deck.

The South Dakotas had considerable main battery turret protection; the turret face plates are 18-inch (457 mm) Class B, the sides are 9.5-inch (241 mm) Class A, the rear is 12-inch (305 mm) Class A, and the roof is 7.25-inch (184 mm) Class B. The barbettes are protected by Class A armor 11.3 inches (287 mm) thick along the centerline and 17.3 inches (439 mm) on the sides. Secondary battery turrets and handling spaces are protected by 2 inches (51 mm) STS. The conning tower is protected by 16-inch (406 mm) thick armor.

The underwater protection was an internal "bulge" that consists of four longitudinal torpedo bulkheads forming a multi-layered system designed to absorb the energy from an underwater explosion equivalent to 700 pounds of TNT (1.3 GJ). The protection system was designed for the torpedo bulkheads to deform and absorb energy while several compartments were liquid loaded in order to disrupt the gas bubble and stop fragments; the total system depth was 17.9 feet (5.46 m). Notably, the armor belt itself, which extended to the triple bottom where it tapered to 1 in (25 mm), formed the third torpedo bulkhead. The lower edge of the belt was welded to the triple bottom structure and the joint was reinforced with buttstraps due to the structural discontinuity from the slight knuckle. It was hoped that extending the armor belt to the triple bottom as one of the torpedo bulkheads can help increase the protection of the system compared to the one used by the previous North Carolina-class. However, caisson tests in 1939 indicated that the South Dakota system was less effective due to the rigidity of the armor belt causing force of the detonation to significantly displace the final holding bulkhead inwards despite remaining watertight. This and several further subscale caisson tests resulted in several modifications, including the system's liquid loading scheme; whereas the North Carolinas had the third and fourth outboard compartments liquid loaded, the South Dakotas had the outer two compartments filled with liquid, typically fuel oil, while the inner two compartments were void spaces; this was done to mitigate the listing potential from a torpedo strike. The system saw further strengthening and refinements in the subsequent Iowa class, which shared similar geometries.

== Service ==
=== South Dakota ===
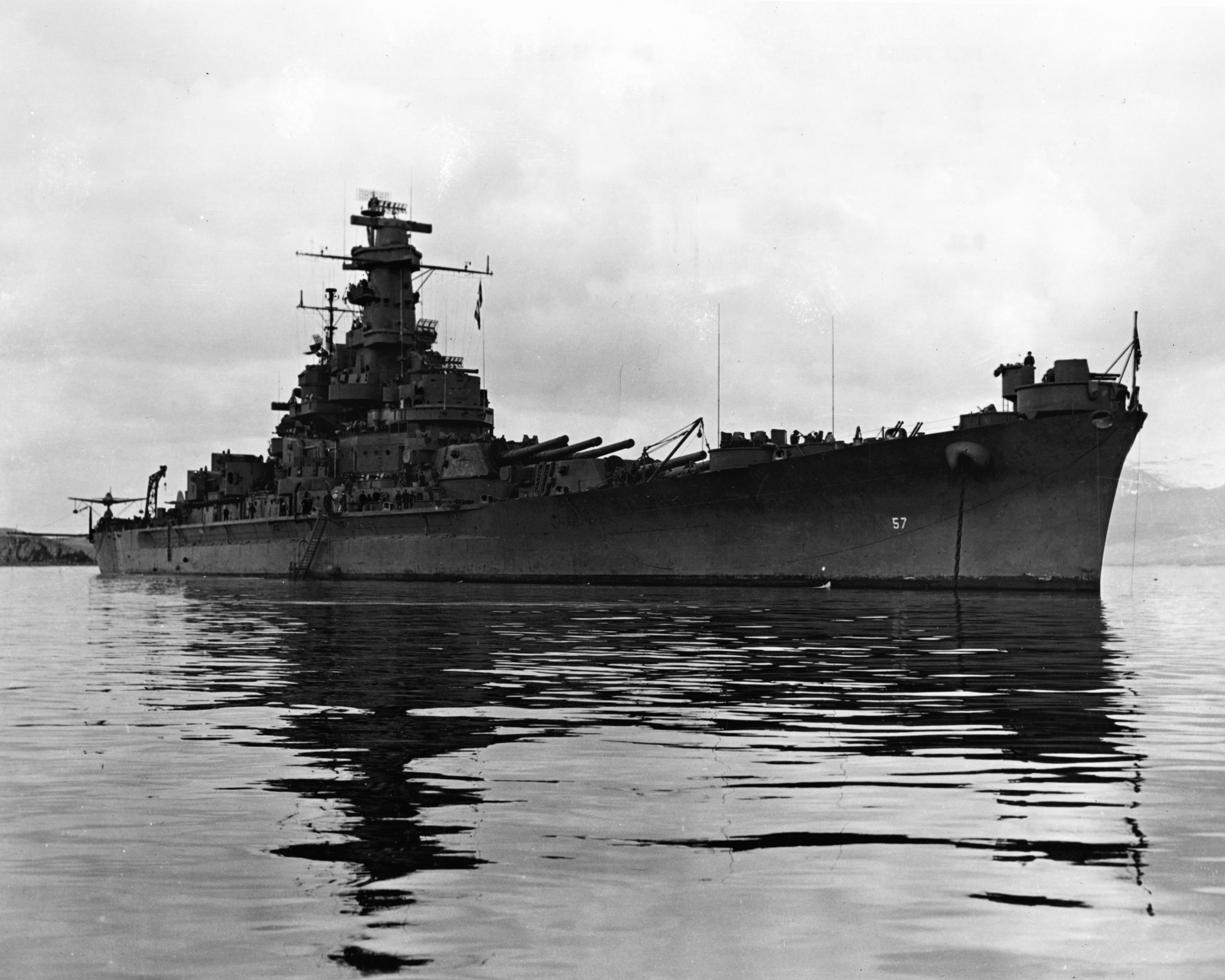
South Dakota anchored off Iceland on 24 June 1943

South Dakota's keel was laid on 5 July 1939 by the New York Shipbuilding Corporation of Camden, New Jersey. She was launched on 7 June 1941 and commissioned on 20 March 1942. She went on a shakedown cruise in June after her fitting out was complete. In August–September, the battleship voyaged from the Atlantic to the Pacific through the Panama Canal; she struck a coral reef soon after arriving in the Tonga Islands and had to sail to the Pearl Harbor Navy Yard for repairs, which took about a month. South Dakota was then assigned to escort the aircraft carrier Enterprise as part of Task Force (TF) 16; joined by TF 17 soon after, the combined fleet—now known as TF 61—was ordered to "make a sweep of the Santa Cruz Islands and then move southwest to block any Japanese forces approaching Guadalcanal." This led to the Battle of Santa Cruz, where in escorting Enterprise, South Dakota was credited with shooting down 26 Japanese planes. The battleship was hit once by a 500 lb (230 kg)-bomb on Turret I during the action.

On 30 October 1942, South Dakota and the destroyer Mahan collided while the latter was investigating a sonar contact with a submarine. Both ships were able to continue to Nouméa, where Vestal repaired them. The battleship joined the North Carolina-class battleship Washington and four destroyers to form TF 64. The ships intercepted a Japanese bombardment force on the night of 14–15 November, and, in a battle now known as the Second Naval Battle of Guadalcanal, they damaged the cruisers Takao and Atago in addition to forcing the battleship Kirishima and destroyer Ayanami to be scuttled. During the battle, a power failure incapacitated South Dakota and she received considerable topside damage—42 shells hit the ship, knocking out radio communications and three fire control radars along with destroying the main radar set.

Partial repairs courtesy of Prometheus' crew allowed South Dakota to sail for New York; after the ship's arrival on 18 December 1942, she was given an overhaul and the battle damage was completely fixed. Departing the yard on 25 February 1943, South Dakota underwent sea trials before escorting Ranger in North Atlantic operations until mid-April, when she joined the British Home Fleet. This deployment lasted until 1 August; the ship then traveled to Norfolk and then the Pacific, arriving at Efate on 14 September. Moving to Fiji on 7 November, she joined Battleship Divisions 8 and 9, which supported Allied forces in the Battle of Tarawa, among other battles. Along with five other battleships, she fired upon Nauru Island on 6 December 1943.

The day of 29 January 1944 saw the ship bombard Roi-Namur before she moved away to protect the carriers assigned to provide air support for multiple amphibious assaults on islands within Kwajalein Atoll. South Dakota provided anti-aircraft support for various fast carrier task forces until June, when she bombarded Saipan and Tinian. The battleship took part in the so-called "Marianas Turkey Shoot", where more than 300 attacking Japanese aircraft were shot down, though she was hit by a 500-pound bomb on the main deck that killed 24 and wounded 27.

For the rest of World War II, South Dakota operated in the Pacific mostly as a carrier escort; the only times she did not was when she received an overhaul at the Puget Sound Navy Yard from July to August 1944, when five tanks of gunpowder for the 16-inch guns exploded on 6 May (putting the ship out of action until 1 June), and when she bombarded Okinawa (24 March 19 April), the Kamaishi Steel Works on Honshu (14 July and 9 August), and Hamamatsu on Honshū (29–30 July). South Dakota was present at the Surrender of Japan aboard Missouri on 2 September 1945; she left Tokyo Bay on 20 September for the west coast of the United States. The battleship set sail for Philadelphia on 3 January 1946 to be overhauled; she was designated as part of the Atlantic Reserve Fleet there in June. Decommissioned on 31 January 1947, South Dakota remained idle until she was stricken from the Naval Register on 1 June 1962 and sold for scrap to the Lipsett Division of Luria Brothers and Company, Inc. on 25 October.

The ship is memorialized at Sioux Falls, South Dakota, where memorabilia and parts of the battleship are displayed within an outline of the main deck. A screw from South Dakota is on display outside the U.S. Navy Museum in Washington, D.C.

=== Indiana ===
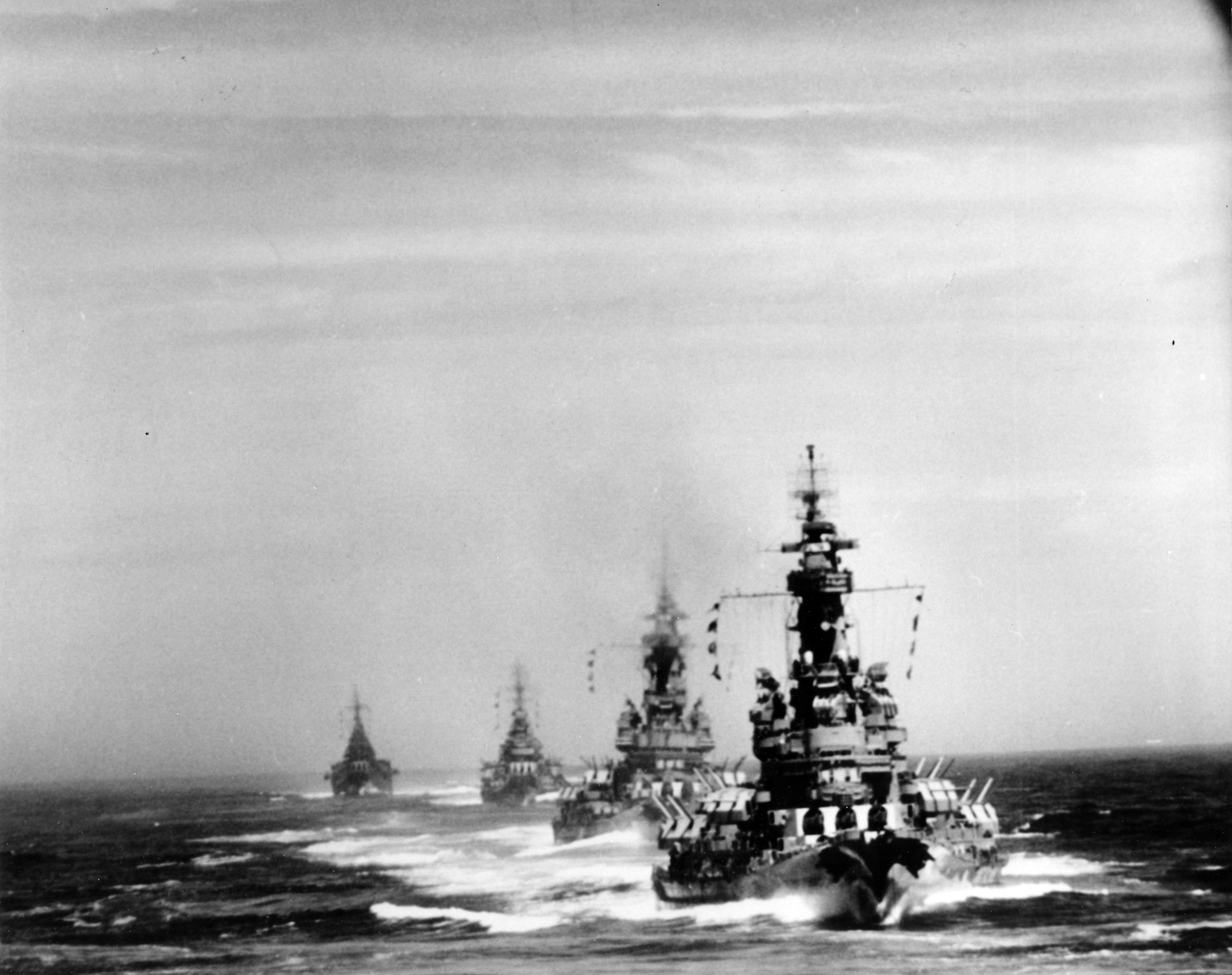
Indiana leading Massachusetts and the heavy cruisers Chicago and Quincy shortly before the bombardment of Kamaishi on 14 July 1945. This photo was taken from South Dakota.

Indiana's keel was laid on 20 September 1939 at the Newport News Shipbuilding and Drydock Company in Newport News, Virginia. She was launched on 21 November 1941; during the fitting out process, the former battleship Kearsarge, which had been rebuilt as a crane ship, lowered the 16-inch guns into their turret mountings. Indiana was commissioned into the fleet on 30 April 1942. After shakedown operations, she was sent directly to the Solomon Islands; Indiana arrived off Guadalcanal on 9 November 1942 and replaced her sister South Dakota, which was in need of repairs. Indiana's operations off Guadalcanal consisted primarily of shore bombardment in support of the Marines fighting on the island.

In November 1943, Indiana took part in the invasion of Tarawa, alongside her sister South Dakota. During this operation, Indiana shot down her first aircraft. The ship also participated in the invasion of the Marshall Islands; on 1 February 1944, the battleship Washington collided with Indiana on her starboard side. 13 of the voids between the torpedo protection system and 13 fuel tanks were flooded, and the longitudinal bulkheads were severely damaged. The starboard outboard propeller was damaged, along with the shaft upon which it was mounted. Two quad-mount 40 mm guns and nine 20 mm guns were destroyed, along with two of the mounts for the 20 mm guns. Indiana's starboard catapult was torn from the ship, along with the Kingfisher float plane that had been sitting on it. The ship suffered a list to starboard, which was corrected by flooding compartments on the port side. Indiana sailed to Majuro Lagoon to be repaired enough to make the voyage back to Pearl Harbor; the resulting work was the largest single repair handled at Pearl Harbor other than the battleships damaged during the attack that started the war.

After Indiana returned to active duty, she participated in the invasion of Hollandia in western New Guinea. The ship then returned to the central Pacific and bombarded Truk, and subsequently took part in operations off the Marianas Islands. On 19 June 1944 a Japanese torpedo bomber attempted to attack the ship, but Indiana's anti-aircraft gunners managed to destroy both the aircraft and the torpedo it had dropped, with no damage to the ship. Shortly thereafter, a second Japanese plane was shot down, but a third managed to crash into the ship. The aircraft disintegrated upon striking the side armor plates and scattered pieces of the plane across the stern. Five men were injured, but the ship suffered only very slight damage.

Indiana returned to Puget Sound naval yard for a needed overhaul. The work lasted until January 1945; the ship returned to active duty on the 24th of that month. Indiana took part in the bombardment of Iwo Jima, as well as in attacks on the Japanese home islands. Following the shore bombardments, Indiana joined the task force that had assembled to invade Okinawa; the ship provided ground support fire as well as anti-aircraft defense against the increasing number of Kamikazes that were attacking the invasion fleet. Indiana continued in these duties until the end of the war in August 1945.

In 1947, Indiana was put into the reserve fleet at Puget Sound. She was finally struck from the Navy List on 1 June 1962, and sold for scrapping on 6 September 1963 for $418,387. The ship breaking was finished in 1964. The battleship's mast was given to Indiana University at Bloomington, and her anchor is on display in Fort Wayne.

=== Massachusetts ===
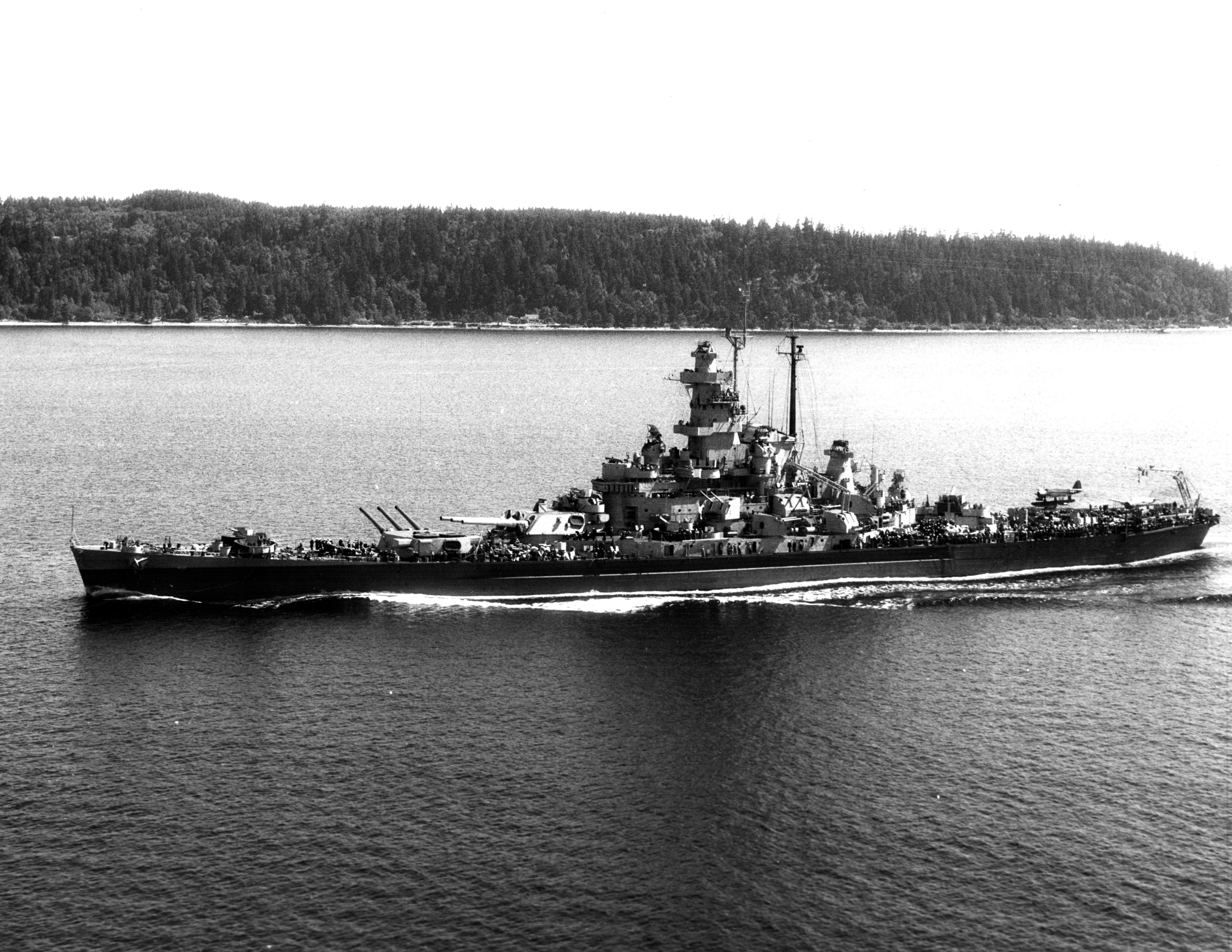
Massachusetts cruising at 15 knots off Point Wilson, Washington on 11 July 1944

Massachusetts, the third ship of the class, was laid down on 20 July 1939 at the Fore River Shipyard of the Bethlehem Steel Corporation in Quincy, Massachusetts. She was launched on 23 September 1941 and commissioned on 12 May 1942. After a shakedown cruise, the battleship departed Casco Bay, Maine on 24 October 1942 to support the Allied invasion of Africa, Operation Torch, as flagship of the Western Naval Task Force. Along with the heavy cruisers Tuscaloosa and Wichita and four destroyers, Massachusetts sailed to Casablanca on the evening of 7 November. The incomplete French battleship Jean Bart, missing one of her quadruple 380 mm/45 caliber gun turrets, was in the harbor, having traveled there in 1940 to escape the German invasion of France. American planes were fired upon and two French submarines were spotted leaving the harbor; at 07:03 the coastal battery at El Hank opened fire on Massachusetts. It was mistakenly assumed that the gunfire had come from Jean Bart, so the order to neutralize the battleship was given. Massachusetts hit Jean Bart five times, and in the process disabled the one active main battery turret. Massachusetts also severely damaged the destroyer Milan, which subsequently had to be beached. Four merchant ships and a floating crane were also destroyed.

During this engagement, seven French destroyers managed to escape the harbor and attempted to make their way to the invasion beaches. At 08:55, Massachusetts increased speed in order to attack the destroyers. The battery at El Hank continued to fire on the ship, and at 10:00, one of the 7.6-inch shells from the coastal battery struck her on the port side between the two forward main gun turrets. The shell penetrated the deck armor and started a small fire that was quickly extinguished. At this time, the French cruiser Primauguet and another two destroyers left the port. Massachusetts and Tuscaloosa sank the destroyer Fougueux, and at 10:05 a 16-inch shell from Massachusetts struck the destroyer Milan, and put her out of action. Primaguet was forced to retire after she was hit by a 16-inch shell from Massachusetts and a number of smaller caliber shells from the American cruisers Brooklyn and Augusta. During the operations off the North African coast on 8 November, Massachusetts fired 786 main battery shells and 221 rounds from her 5-inch guns.

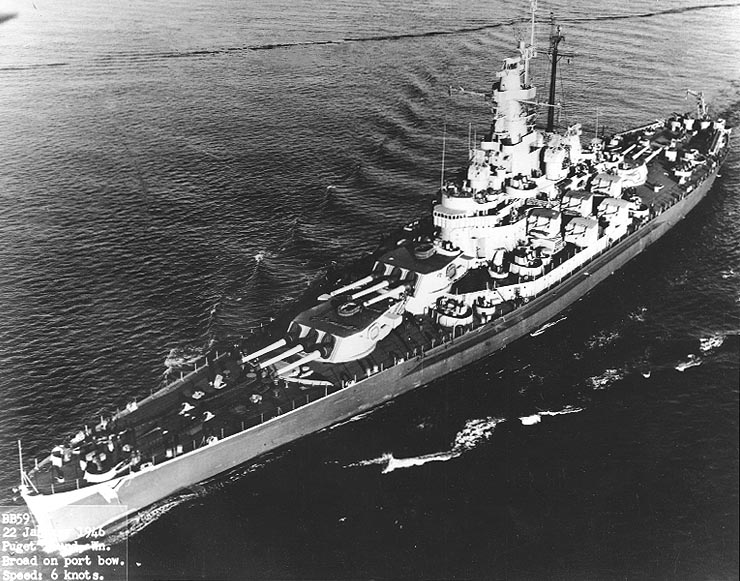
Massachusetts underway

Following her successful operations off North Africa, Massachusetts was taken in for an overhaul in the Boston Navy Yard. After the refitting, the ship sailed for the Pacific theater, and arrived in Nouméa on 4 March. The battleship supported operations in the South Pacific over the next months, including guarding convoy lanes, escorting aircraft carriers, and bombarding Japanese positions on various islands, including Nauru (8 December 1943) and Kwajalein (30 January 1944). Returning to carrier protection after the latter bombardment, Massachusetts provided anti-aircraft defense while Allied air attacks were sent against Saipan, Tinian and Guam; she also supported later invasions of the Caroline Islands and Hollandia. After bombarding Ponape Island on 1 May, the ship set course for the Puget Sound Navy Yard for an overhaul and to have her gun barrels relined, as they had worn out.

Back on active duty, Massachusetts departed Pearl Harbor on 1 August. Joining Task Force 38, she supported forces landing around Leyte Gulf, and provided cover for task groups attacking Japanese warships in the Battle for Leyte Gulf, Okinawa, and Formosa. Moving to the Philippines, the battleship protected Allied ships and troops during the Battle of Mindoro and was part of a force that struck Manila. Massachusetts, along with the rest of TF 38, ran into Typhoon Cobra, which had winds of around 120 kn (140 mph; 220 km/h). She continued to operate with TF 38 from 30 December and 23 January 1945; the ships struck Formosa and Okinawa, provided cover for an amphibious assault on Lingayen, and made forays into the South China Sea to attack Japanese shipping and airfields.

In February–early March 1945, Massachusetts provided anti-aircraft cover for airborne raids on Honshū, Iwo Jima and Kyushu. On 24 March, the ship bombarded Okinawa; for the remainder of that month and a majority of April, Massachusetts once again provided anti-aircraft defense, this time for Allied ships massed near Okinawa. On 5 June, she suffered through another typhoon, Louise, this one with 100 kn (120 mph; 190 km/h) winds. Five days later, she bombarded Minamidaitō. 1 July saw the Third Fleet and Massachusetts set course for Japan; the battleship protected carriers while they launched raids on Tokyo, then moved closer to land to hit targets with gunfire. Massachusetts attacked Japan's second largest iron and steel center, Kamaishi on Honshū, on 14 July; Hamamatsu on 28 July; and Kamaishi on 9 August. The latter bombardment was probably the last 16-inch shell fired during World War II.

With the war over, Massachusetts voyaged to the Puget Sound Navy Yard once more for an overhaul; once completed, she left on 28 January 1946 and operated off the California coast before setting course for Hampton Roads via the Panama Canal. After she arrived on 22 April, Massachusetts was decommissioned on 27 March 1947 and entered the Atlantic Reserve Fleet; she was struck from the Naval Register on 1 June 1962, but not scrapped. Instead, the battleship was given to the Massachusetts Memorial Committee on 8 June 1965 to become a museum ship in Fall River, Massachusetts; she has been located in "Battleship Cove" ever since.

=== Alabama ===
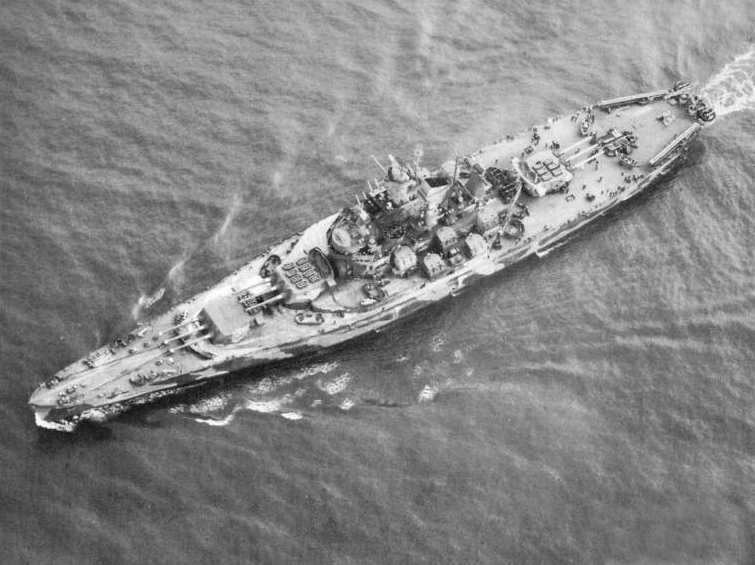
Alabama during her shakedown in 1942

Construction work on Alabama, the fourth and final member of the South Dakota class, began on 1 February 1940 in the Norfolk Navy Yard with the keel laying. She was launched on 16 February 1942 and commissioned into service six months later, on 16 August. Alabama sailed on her shakedown cruise from the Chesapeake Bay on 11 November, which culminated in Casco Bay, Maine. Minor repairs were carried out in Norfolk, after which the big ship returned to Casco Bay to conduct training maneuvers with her sister, South Dakota. Beginning in March 1943, Alabama was assigned to the British Home Fleet, and tasked with convoy escort duties on the route to the Soviet Union. She was relieved of these duties in July so that she could return to Norfolk for a brief overhaul in August.

Later in August, Alabama departed for the Pacific theater; the ship was assigned to the US Third Fleet during the amphibious operations in the Gilbert islands, particularly Kwajalein in early 1944. During the night of 21 February 1944, Alabama's 5-inch guns were firing upon Japanese aircraft in the area. The ship turned in the direction of the Japanese aircraft in order to better engage them, but the rearmost turret was masked behind the amidships mount. The gunner in the rearmost turret accidentally overrode the safety mechanism that prevented the gun from firing in that circumstance, and when the gun was fired, it hit the 5-inch turret in front of it. Five men were killed and 11 wounded in the incident; an investigation revealed that the override switch was faulty and prone to accidental operation.

Alabama shot down her first Japanese aircraft the following month, in March 1944. The ship conducted anti-aircraft defense operations during the Battle of the Philippine Sea in June 1944. After that, she joined other battleships that were providing gunfire support to the ground troops in the Marianas islands. She was assigned to Task Force 34 during the Battle of Leyte Gulf in October 1944. In early 1945, Alabama returned for repair and refit work at the Puget Sound naval yard; the work consisted primarily of improvements to her guns and radar equipment. By early May the ship returned to fleet operations. She was tasked with providing anti-aircraft support to the fast carrier groups that were launching air strikes on the Japanese main island of Kyushu. In July 1945, she shelled a number of areas in Japan, including Kamaishi on the 14th, Hitachi on the 18th, and Hamamatsu on the 29th and 30th. These turned out to be her last offensive operations of the war. Her last duty in the Far East was to assist in the landing of occupation forces in Japan, after which she departed for the United States.

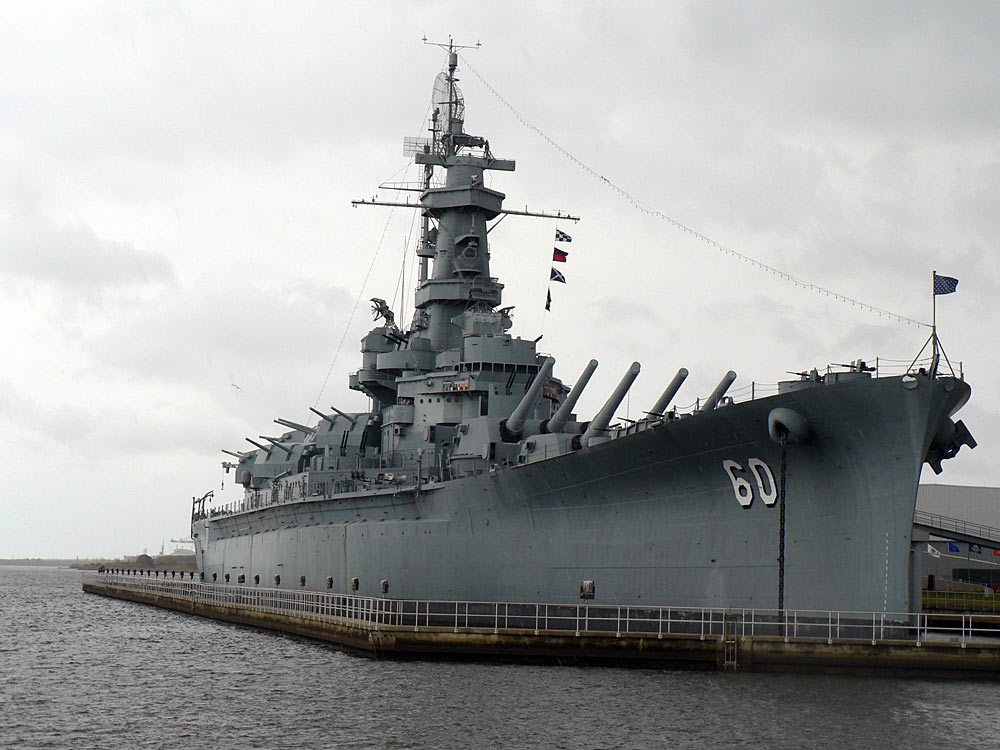
Alabama in 2008 moored as a museum ship in Mobile

On 9 January 1947, Alabama was placed into the reserve fleet in Bremerton, Washington, where she remained until 1 June 1962, when she was removed from the Navy List. Alabama was transferred to the USS Alabama Battleship Commission, which had acquired the ship in order to turn her into a memorial. She was towed out of Bremerton on 2 July 1964, to Mobile, Alabama, where she currently resides as a museum ship, the main attraction of Battleship Memorial Park.

=== Conversion proposal ===
On 26 July 1954, a conversion proposal for the South Dakota–class ships was ordered by the Chairman of the Ship Characteristics Board. The request was made for the ships' speed to be increased to at least 31 knots. To do so, the design staff decided to remove the aft turret and use the weight and space gained to install either a set of improved steam turbines or a set of gas turbines. Either system would have to produce at least 256,000 shaft horsepower (190 MW)—the minimum requirement to achieve 31 knots on the South Dakota hull. Unfortunately, this would have necessitated alterations to the hull form, particularly in the rear of the ship. Larger propellers were also required, and all four shafts would have had to have been completely rebuilt to accommodate the changes. Estimates for the project ran as high as $40,000,000 per ship, and this did not include the cost of reactivating the ship and upgrades to its electrical and combat systems. As a result, the conversion program was halted.

== Ships in class ==
Construction data
Ship name	Hull no.	Builder	Laid down	Launched	Commissioned	Decommissioned	Fate
South Dakota	BB-57	New York Shipbuilding Corporation, Camden, New Jersey	5 July 1939	7 June 1941	20 March 1942	31 January 1947	Struck 1 June 1962; Sold for scrap, 25 October 1962
Indiana	BB-58	Newport News Shipbuilding and Drydock Company, Newport News, Virginia	20 September 1939	21 November 1941	30 April 1942	11 September 1947	Struck 1 June 1962; Sold for scrap, 23 October 1963
Massachusetts	BB-59	Bethlehem Steel Corporation, Fore River Shipyard, Quincy, Massachusetts	20 July 1939	23 September 1941	12 May 1942	27 March 1947	Struck 1 June 1962; Museum ship at Battleship Cove in Fall River, Massachusetts, since 14 August 1965
Alabama	BB-60	Norfolk Naval Shipyard	1 February 1940	16 February 1942	16 August 1942	9 January 1947	Struck 1 June 1962; Museum ship at Battleship Memorial Park in Mobile, Alabama, since 11 June 1964
