= Japanese destroyer Ayanami (1929) =

Fubuki-class destroyer

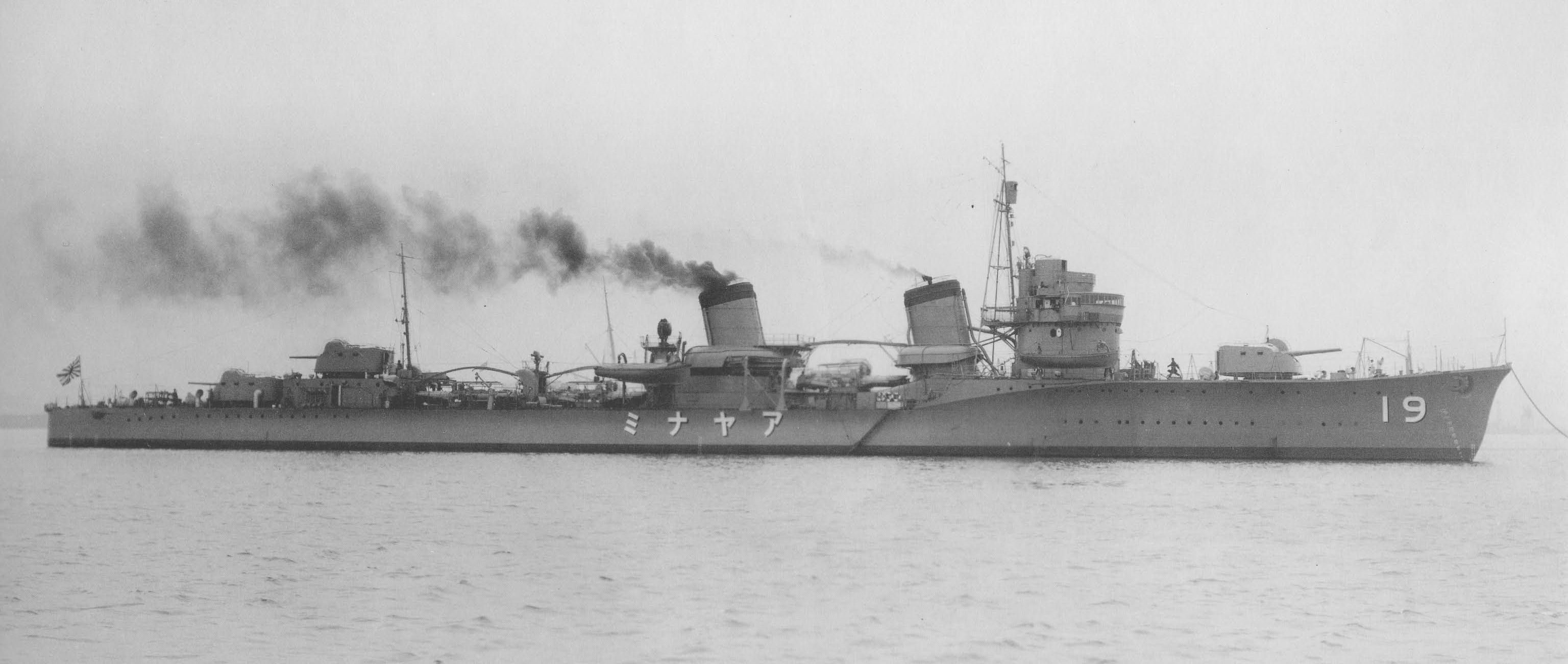
- Ayanami on 30 April 1930

History

Empire of Japan
- Name: Ayanami
- Ordered: 1923 Fiscal Year
- Builder: Fujinagata Shipyards
- Yard number: Destroyer No. 45
- Laid down: 20 January 1928
- Launched: 5 October 1929
- Commissioned: 30 April 1930
- Stricken: 15 December 1942
- Nickname(s): The Demon of Solomon (Islands), Kurohyō (黒豹)
- Fate: Sunk by gunfire from USS Washington, 15 November 1942

General characteristics
- Class & type: Fubuki-class destroyer
- Displacement: 1,750 long tons (1,780 t) standard; 2,050 long tons (2,080 t) re-built
- Length: 111.96 m (367.3 ft) pp; 115.3 m (378 ft) waterline; 118.41 m (388.5 ft) overall
- Beam: 10.4 m (34 ft 1 in)
- Draft: 3.2 m (10 ft 6 in)
- Propulsion: 4 × Kampon type boilers; 2 × Kampon Type Ro geared turbines; 2 × shafts at 50,000 ihp (37,000 kW)
- Speed: 38 knots (44 mph; 70 km/h)
- Range: 5,000 nmi (9,300 km) at 14 knots (26 km/h)
- Complement: 219
- Armament: 6 × Type 3 127 mm 50 caliber naval guns (3×2); up to 22 × Type 96 25 mm AT/AA Guns; up to 10 × 13 mm AA guns; 9 × 610 mm (24 in) torpedo tubes; 36 × depth charges

Service record
- Operations: Second Sino-Japanese War; Battle of Malaya; Battle of Midway; Indian Ocean raid; Solomon Islands campaign

Ayanami (綾波; lit. 'Twilled Waves') was the eleventh of twenty-four Fubuki-class destroyers, built for the Imperial Japanese Navy following World War I.

== History ==
Construction of the advanced Fubuki-class destroyers was authorized as part of the Imperial Japanese Navy's expansion program from fiscal 1923, intended to give Japan a qualitative edge with the world's most modern ships. The Fubuki class drastically improved upon previous destroyer designs; so much so that they were designated Special Type destroyers (特型, Tokugata). The large size, powerful engines, high speed, large radius of action and unprecedented armament gave these destroyers the firepower similar to many light cruisers in other navies. Ayanami, built at the Fujinagata Shipyards in Osaka was the first in an improved series, which incorporated a modified gun turret which could elevate her main battery of Type 3 127 mm 50 caliber naval guns to 75° as opposed to the original 40°, thus permitting the guns to be used as dual purpose guns against aircraft. Ayanami was the first destroyer in the world with this ability. Ayanami was laid down on 20 January 1928, launched on 5 October 1929 and commissioned on 30 April 1930. Originally assigned hull designation "Destroyer No. 45", she inherited the name of her predecessor on 1 August before her launch.

In her original construction, Ayanami was over 200 tons overweight. Following the 4th Fleet Incident, which saw major cracks develop in the hulls of several IJN vessels as a result of severe weather, which occurred only a year after her commissioning, Ayanami and the rest of the ships in her class were quickly taken back to the shipyards to have added top weight reduction and strengthening of the hull.

== Operational history ==
On completion, Ayanami, along with her sister ships, Uranami, Shikinami, and Isonami, were assigned to Destroyer Division 19 under the IJN 2nd Fleet. During the Second Sino-Japanese War, from 1937, Ayanami covered landing of Japanese forces in Shanghai and Hangzhou. From 1940, she was assigned to patrol and covered landings of Japanese forces in south China.

At the time of the attack on Pearl Harbor, Ayanami was assigned to Destroyer Division 19 of Desron 3 of the IJN 1st Fleet, and had deployed from Kure Naval District to the port of Samah on Hainan Island, escorting Japanese troopships for landing operations in the Battle of Malaya.

On 19 December, Ayanami sank the Dutch submarine HNLMS O 20 with assistance from her sister ships Uranami and Yugiri and rescued 32 survivors.

Ayanami subsequently was part of the escort for the heavy cruisers Suzuya, Kumano, Mogami and Mikuma in support of "Operation L" (the invasion of Banka, Palembang and the Anambas Islands in the Netherlands East Indies), taking minor damage after striking a reef in the Anambas, necessitating a return to Camranh Bay, French Indochina for emergency repairs. At the end of February, Ayanami went to the assistance of Chōkai, which had run aground off Saigon as well.

In March, Ayanami was assigned to "Operation T" (the invasion of northern Sumatra) and "Operation D", (the invasion of the Andaman Islands). She served patrol and escort duties out of Port Blair during the Japanese raids into the Indian Ocean. On 13–22 April she returned via Singapore and Camranh Bay to Kure Naval Arsenal, for maintenance.

On 4–5 June, Ayanami participated in the Battle of Midway as part of Admiral Isoroku Yamamoto's main fleet. Ayanami sailed from Amami-Ōshima to Mako Guard District, Singapore, Sabang and Mergui for a projected second Indian Ocean raid. The operation was cancelled due to the Guadalcanal campaign, and Ayanami was ordered to Truk instead, arriving in late August. During the Battle of the Eastern Solomons on 24 August Ayanami escorted the fleet supply group to Guadalcanal. She was assigned to numerous "Tokyo Express" transport missions to various locations in the Solomon Islands in October and November.

Ayanami's final mission, on November 14–15, 1942, was that of the Second Naval Battle of Guadalcanal, where she was conducting transport runs. There, she was attached to a scouting force under the command of Rear Admiral Shintarō Hashimoto in the light cruiser Sendai. When American Admiral Willis A. Lee's Task Force 64 was spotted near Savo Island, Hashimoto took his ships clockwise around the island, but sent Ayanami alone in the opposite direction sweeping for enemy vessels. When Lee's ships were located, the order to attack was given, and as such, Ayanami became one of three prongs in the initial attack (Along with Hashimoto's group, and another group led by Rear Admiral Susumu Kimura in the light cruiser Nagara).

Ayanami was first sighted by the American destroyer USS Walke, but the light cruiser Nagara was located soon after and the four destroyers' attentions shifted to it. Torpedo and shellfire from Ayanami, Nagara, and Uranami sank two of the four destroyers (USS Preston and USS Walke), mortally wounded USS Benham (which was scuttled after the battle), and severely damaged USS Gwin, causing heavy American losses in the first phase of the battle.

Lee's USS Washington then sighted Ayanami and shelled her. The Japanese destroyer sustained critical damage and 27 of her crew were killed; she fired one shell, which missed Washington. Thirty surviving crew members including Commander Sakuma escaped in a boat to Guadalcanal; the remainder were taken off by Uranami. At the same time Washington crippled and sank the battleship Kirishima. Later in the night Uranami scuttled the abandoned Ayanami with a single torpedo, and she sank soon after 02:00. Her wreck remains at the bottom of Ironbottom Sound.

On 15 December 1942, Ayanami was removed from the navy list.

== The wreck ==
In late July 1992 marine archeologist Robert Ballard led an expedition to Ironbottom Sound, finding thirteen newly discovered shipwrecks. Among these new finds were the remains of Ayanami. They were found southeast of Savo Island at 9°10′S 159°52′E at a depth of approximately 700 metres (2,300 ft). The hull and keel of the ship appear to have been broken by a starboard torpedo blast just behind the bridge; the ship came to rest in two pieces, with the stern upright, and the bow twisted and lying on its starboard side.
