= Main battery =

Primary weapon of Warship

Cut-away illustration of a triple 16"/50 caliber Mark 7 gun turret. Three of these formed the main battery of the Iowa-class battleships.

A main battery is the primary weapon or group of weapons around which a warship is designed. As such, a main battery was historically a naval gun or group of guns used in volleys, as in the broadsides of cannon on a ship of the line. Later, this came to be turreted groups of similar large-caliber naval rifles. With the evolution of technology the term has come to encompass guided missiles and torpedoes as a warship's principal offensive weaponry, deployed both on surface ships and submarines.

A main battery features common parts, munition and fire control system across the weapons which it comprises.

== Description ==
In the age of cannon at sea, the main battery was the principal group of weapons around which a ship was designed, usually its heavies. With the coming of naval rifles and subsequent revolving gun turrets, the main battery became the principal group of heaviest guns, regardless of how many turrets they were placed in. As missiles displaced guns both above and below the water their principal group became a vessel's main battery.

Between the Age of Sail and its cannons and the dreadnought era of large iron warships fighting ships' weapons deployments lacked standardization, with a variety of naval rifles of mixed breach and caliber scattered throughout vessels. Dreadnoughts resolved this in favor of a main battery of large guns, supported by largely defensive secondary batteries of smaller guns of standardized form, further augmented on large warships such as battleships and cruisers with smaller yet tertiary batteries. As air superiority became all-important early in World War II, weight of broadside fell by the wayside as a vessel's principal fighting asset. Anti-aircraft batteries of scores of small-caliber rapid-fire weapons came to supplant big guns even on large warships assigned to protect vital fast carrier task forces. At sea, ships such as small, fast destroyers assigned to convoy protection, essential in the transport of the enormous stock of materials required for land war particularly in the European Theater, came to rely more on depth charge projectors.

The terms main battery and secondary battery fell out of favor as ships were designed to carry surface-to-air missiles and anti-ship missiles with greater range and heavier warheads than their guns. Such ships often referred to their remaining guns as simply the gun battery and to the missiles as the missile battery. Ships with more than one type of missile might refer to the batteries by the name of the missile. USS Chicago had a Talos battery and a Tartar battery.

== Examples ==
The German battleship Bismarck, carried a main battery of eight 15 inch (380mm) guns, along with a secondary battery of twelve 5.9 inch (150mm) guns for defense against destroyers and torpedo boats, and an anti-aircraft battery of various guns ranging in caliber from 4.1 inch (105mm) to 20mm guns.

Animated diagram highlighting the main (red) and secondary (blue) batteries of the battleship USS Washington.

Many later ships during World War II used dual-purpose guns to combine the secondary battery and the heavier guns of the anti-aircraft battery for increased flexibility and economy. The United States Navy battleship USS Washington had a main battery of nine 16-inch (410 mm) guns arranged in three turrets, two forward and one aft. The secondary battery was 5-inch dual purpose guns, allowing use against other ships and aircraft. A dedicated anti-aircraft battery was composed of light Bofors 40 mm guns and Oerlikon 20 mm cannon.
