= List of U.S. military equipment named for Native Americana =

This is a list of U.S. military equipment named after Native American peoples, places, weapons or material culture.

== Background ==
The U.S. Army and "Indians" could fairly be described as traditional enemies of one another in the 19th century; among other things there was a long series of conflicts known as the Indian Wars. In the 20th and 21st centuries Indigenous peoples played a significant role in U.S. military operations; for example the code talkers of World Wars I and II, and Ira Hayes, one of the soldiers who raised the flag on Iwo Jima, was Akimel O'odham (Pima) born and raised in Gila River Indian Community.

U.S. Army General Hamilton H. Howze, put in charge of naming helicopters in 1947, disliked the existing insect names "Hoverfly" and "Dragonfly" (the official name for the R-4 and planned name for the H-5), and decided the H-13 should be named for the Sioux. This was a tradition for years and was codified into army regulation in 1969 with AR 70-28: "Army aircraft were specifically categorized as requiring 'Indian terms and names of American Indian tribes and chiefs.' Names to choose from were provided by the Bureau of Indian Affairs." According to one military analyst arguing that U.S. military equipment names should be more evocative than an opaque series of names and numbers: "The 1969 regulation codifying the tradition directed that name selection should appeal to the imagination, respect dignity, suggest aggressive spirit and confidence in the platform, and reflect its tactical characteristics. Such criteria should be applied more broadly." The tradition continued after AR 70-28 was repealed prior to the designation of the Eurocopter UH-72 Lakota, but was not regulated to do so.

The only exception to AR 70-28 was for the Bell AH-1 Cobra, a dedicated attack helicopter.

== Aircraft required to be named for tribes or chiefs ==
- C-12 Huron transport aircraft
- OH-58 Kiowa observation helicopter
- U-21 Ute utility aircraft
- MH-6 Little Bird light helicopter. This was a variant of the Cayuse, yet was given a new name.
- UH-60 Black Hawk utility helicopter
- TH-67 Creek trainer helicopter
- AH-64 Apache attack helicopter
- RAH-66 Comanche recon/attack helicopter
- ARH-70 Arapaho attack/recon helicopter
- CH-54 Tarhe heavy helicopter

== Aircraft named by tradition ==
- OV-1 Mohawk twin-engine observation aircraft
- RU-8 Seminole utility aircraft
- T-41 Mescalero trainer aircraft
- H-13 Sioux helicopter, the first one.
- H-19 Chickasaw transport helicopter
- H-21 Shawnee transport helicopter, originally the H-21 Workhorse, but C models were designated Shawnee.
- H-34 Choctaw transport helicopter
- CH-37 Mohave heavy-lift helicopter
- CH-47 Chinook heavy-lift transport helicopter
- CH-54 Tarhe heavy lift helicopter. Tarhe was nicknamed "The Crane", and the helicopter named after him, also called the "Skycrane" is built around a large crane assembly.
- AH-56 Cheyenne attack helicopter
- UH-1 Iroquois utility helicopter
- OH-6 Cayuse observation helicopter
- UH-72 Lakota utility helicopter

== Others ==
- USNS Sacagawea
- USS Chickasaw
- USS Evans (DE-1023) and USS Ernest E. Evans (DDG-141), both named for Ernest E. Evans. Two other USS Evans existed, but were named after a different Evans.
- USS James E. Williams
- USS Platte
- BGM-109 Tomahawk cruise missile

== Reception ==
David Gipp, president of United Tribes Technical College, presents a bow and arrow to Army Maj. Gen. David Sprynczynatyk during the UH-72A Lakota dedication ceremony.

Native American elders have held traditional dedication ceremonies for a number of Army helicopters, including the UH-72 Lakota in 2012.

== See also ==
- Code name Geronimo controversy
