= Chickasaw (disambiguation) =

The Chickasaw are a Native American people.

Chickasaw may also refer to:

- Chickasaw language, spoken by the tribe
- Chickasaw Nation

== Places in the United States ==
- Chickasaw, Alabama
- Chickasaw, Louisville, a neighborhood of Louisville, Kentucky
- Chickasaw, Ohio
- Chickasaw, Pennsylvania
- Chickasaw County (disambiguation), counties of that name in different states

== Other ==
- Chickasaw Council, of the Boy Scouts of America in Memphis, TN
- Memphis Chicks (Southern Association), a minor league baseball team from 1901 to 1960
- Memphis Chicks (Southern League), a minor league baseball team from 1978 to 1997
- Sikorsky H-19 Chickasaw, a helicopter
- USS Chickasaw, various United States Navy ships

== See also ==
- Chickasaw State Park (disambiguation)
