= USS Evans =

Four ships in the United States Navy have been named USS Evans, the first two for Robley D. Evans, and the latter two for Ernest E. Evans.

- USS Evans (DD-78) was a Wickes-class destroyer launched in 1918, and transferred in 1940 to the Royal Navy as HMS Mansfield, and decommissioned in 1944
- USS Evans (DD-552) was a Fletcher-class destroyer, launched in 1942 and scrapped in 1947
- USS Evans (DE-1023) was a Dealey-class destroyer escort named for Ernest E. Evans. She was launched in 1955 and stricken in 1973
- USS Ernest E. Evans (DDG-141) is a planned Arleigh Burke-class destroyer.

== See also ==
- USS Clarence L. Evans (DE-113) was a Cannon-class destroyer escort, named for Clarence Lee Evans
- USS Frank E. Evans (DD-754) was an Allen M. Sumner-class destroyer, named for Frank Evans, launched in 1944 and sunk in 1969
