= Chickasaw State Park =

Chickasaw State Park is the name of two parks in the United States:

- Chickasaw State Park (Alabama)
- Chickasaw State Park (Tennessee)
