= USS Platte =

USS Platte may refer to the following ships of the United States Navy:

- USS Platte (AO-24) was a Cimarron-class oiler launched in 1939 and scrapped in 1971.
- USS Platte (AO-186) was a Cimarron-class fleet replenishment oiler launched in 1982 and scrapped in 2014.
