= USS Ernest E. Evans =

Guided missile destroyer

History

United States
- Name: Ernest E. Evans
- Namesake: Ernest E. Evans
- Awarded: 15 August 2023
- Builder: Ingalls Shipbuilding
- Identification: Hull number: DDG-141
- Status: Announced

General characteristics
- Class & type: Arleigh Burke-class destroyer
- Displacement: 9,217 tons (full load)
- Length: 510 ft (160 m)
- Beam: 66 ft (20 m)
- Propulsion: 4 × General Electric LM2500 gas turbines 100,000 shp (75,000 kW)
- Speed: 31 knots (57 km/h; 36 mph)
- Complement: 380 officers and enlisted
- Armament: Guns: 1 × 5-inch (127 mm)/62 Mk 45 Mod 4 (lightweight gun); 1 × 20 mm (0.8 in) Phalanx CIWS; 2 × 25 mm (0.98 in) Mk 38 machine gun system; 4 × 0.50 in (12.7 mm) caliber guns; Missiles: 1 × 32-cell, 1 × 64-cell (96 total cells) Mk 41 vertical launching system (VLS): RIM-66M surface-to-air missile; RIM-156 surface-to-air missile; RIM-174A Standard ERAM; RIM-161 anti-ballistic missile; RIM-162 ESSM (quad-packed); BGM-109 Tomahawk cruise missile; RUM-139 vertical launch ASROC; Torpedoes: 2 × Mark 32 triple torpedo tubes: Mark 46 lightweight torpedo; Mark 50 lightweight torpedo; Mark 54 lightweight torpedo
- Armor: Kevlar-type armor with steel hull. Numerous passive survivability measures.
- Aircraft carried: 2 × MH-60R Seahawk helicopters
- Aviation facilities: Double hangar and helipad

USS Ernest E. Evans (DDG-141) is the planned 91st Arleigh Burke-class (Flight III) Aegis guided missile destroyer of the United States Navy. She is named for US Navy Commander Ernest E. Evans, who was the first Native American in the Navy to be awarded the Medal of Honor. The award was given posthumously after Evans died leading a small group of ships in a charge against a force that was superior in both numbers and firepower, in what would become to be known as "The Last Stand of the Tin Can Sailors". This occurred during the Battle off Samar, part of the overall Battle of Leyte Gulf in the Pacific theater during World War II. While this will be the fourth ship overall to bear the name Evans, this is the second named for Ernest E. Evans, the first being USS Evans (DE-1023), a Dealey-class destroyer escort; the other two ships are named for an admiral of no relation. Secretary of the Navy Carlos Del Toro made the announcement during Native American Heritage Month, while at the United States Naval Academy on 15 November 2023. The contract to build Ernest E. Evans was awarded to Ingalls Shipbuilding, a part of Huntington Ingalls Industries (HII), in August 2023.
