= Chickasaw County =

Chickasaw County is the name of two counties in the United States:

- Chickasaw County, Iowa
- Chickasaw County, Mississippi
