= USS Chickasaw =

USS Chickasaw may refer to the following ships of the United States Navy:

- USS Chickasaw (1864), a monitor in commission from 1864 to 1865
- USS Chickasaw (1882), a tug commissioned in 1898 and sold in 1913
- USS Chickasaw (AT-83), a tug commissioned in 1943 and sold in 1976
