= Ernest E. Evans =

United States Navy Medal of Honor recipient

Ernest Edwin Evans
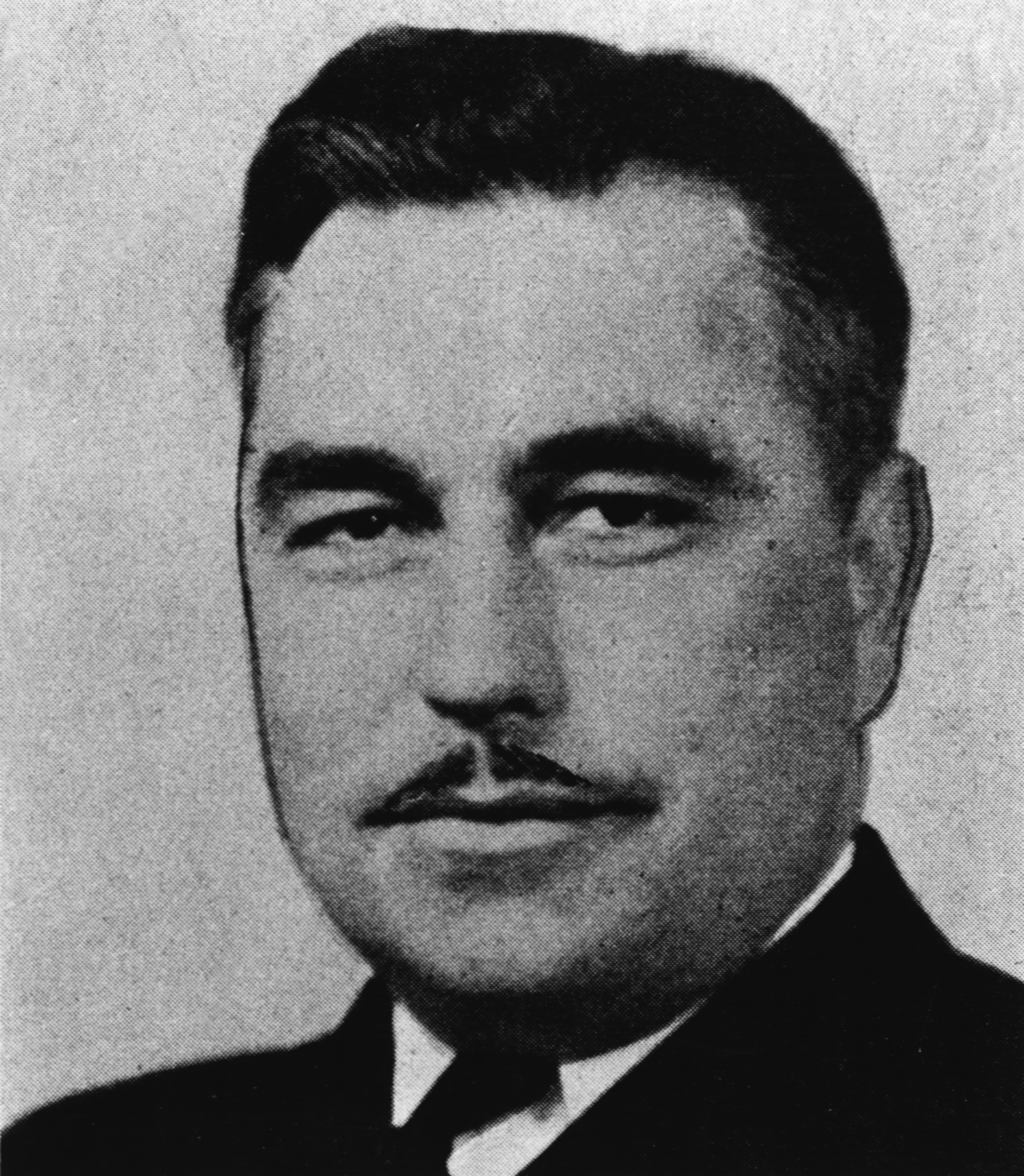
- Evans in 1944
- Born: August 13, 1908; Pawnee, Oklahoma
- Died: October 25, 1944 (aged 36) off Samar, Philippine Islands
- Burial place: remains not recovered; listed on the Walls of the Missing, Manila American Cemetery
- Military career
- Allegiance: United States
- Branch: United States Navy
- Service years: 1931–1944
- Rank: Commander
- Nickname: "Big Chief"
- Commands: USS Alden; USS Johnston
- Conflicts: World War II: Battle off Samar †
- Awards: Medal of Honor; Bronze Star; Philippine Liberation Medal

Ernest Edwin Evans (August 13, 1908 – October 25, 1944) was an officer of the United States Navy who posthumously received the Medal of Honor for his actions during the Battle off Samar in World War II.

== Biography ==
Evans, of Native American ancestry (Cherokee/Creek), was born in Pawnee, Oklahoma and graduated from Muskogee Central High School. After one year of enlisted service in the Navy, he was appointed to the United States Naval Academy, entering as a Midshipman on June 29, 1927. He graduated from the academy in 1931.

On August 9, 1941, Evans was assigned to the destroyer Alden, and was serving on her in the East Indies when the Japanese attacked Pearl Harbor on December 7 of that year. He became commanding officer of Alden on March 14, 1942, and held that position until July 7, 1943. While serving on Alden, he participated in operations in and around Australia, New Guinea and the Dutch East Indies.

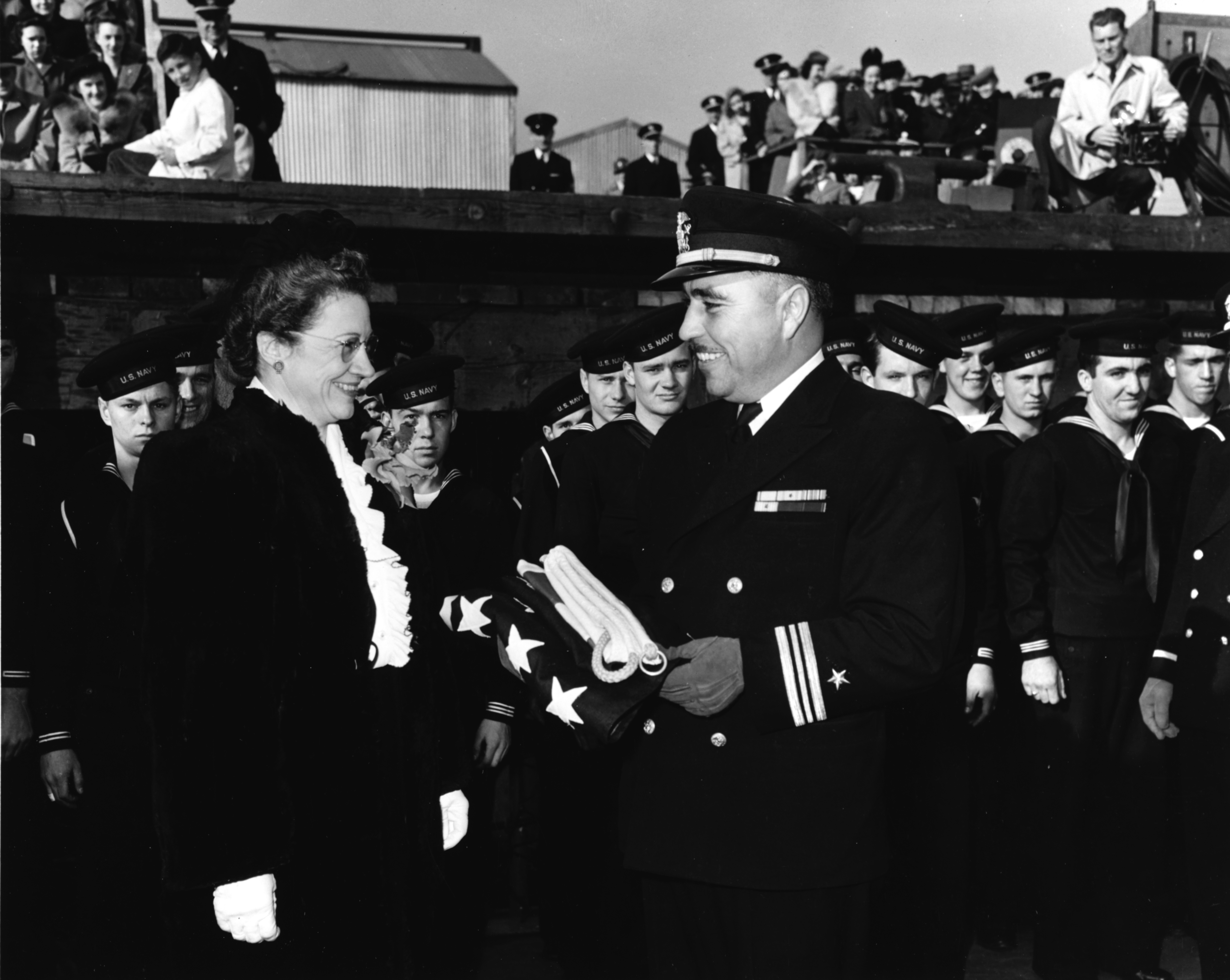
Evans at the commissioning ceremony of the destroyer USS Johnston, Seattle, 1943

In mid-1943, Evans was ordered to duty in charge of fitting out the Fletcher-class destroyer Johnston at the Seattle-Tacoma Shipbuilding Corporation in Seattle, Washington. Commander Evans assumed command of Johnston at her commissioning on October 27, 1943, declaring to the assembled crew, "this is going to be a fighting ship. I intend to go in harm's way, and anyone who doesn't want to go along had better get off right now". He was awarded the Bronze Star for meritorious achievement in sinking the Japanese submarine I-176 on May 16, 1944.

== Battle off Samar ==
In the Battle off Samar, a part of the Battle of Leyte Gulf, Evans led Johnston until she was sunk on October 25, 1944, by a Japanese force that was vastly superior in number, firepower, and armor. Johnston, together with the destroyers Hoel and Heermann, four destroyer escorts (including Samuel B. Roberts) and six escort carriers (CVEs) formed the task unit 77.4.3, known as Taffy 3. This group, together with planes from Taffy 2 (TU 77.4.2), ultimately forced a Japanese battlegroup consisting of 4 battleships, 6 heavy cruisers, 2 light cruisers and 11 destroyers to abort its original mission to attack the landing beaches at Leyte under the command of General Douglas MacArthur, and retreat. The famous battle has become known as "The Last Stand of the Tin Can Sailors" after the 2004 book of the same name.

When the Japanese fleet was first sighted, Evans did not hesitate. After laying a smoke screen to help hide the escort carriers from enemy gunfire, he ordered "Flank speed, full right rudder" and he led his destroyer out of the task unit's circular antiaircraft disposition in favor of charging the enemy alone to make a torpedo attack. Some claim that Evans told his crew over the ship's intercom: "A large Japanese fleet has been contacted. They are fifteen miles away and headed in our direction. They are believed to have four battleships, eight cruisers, and a number of destroyers. This will be a fight against overwhelming odds from which survival cannot be expected. We will do what damage we can." However, contemporaneous sources credit the latter part of this dramatic announcement to lieutenant commander Robert W. Copeland of destroyer escort Samuel B. Roberts, who charged in with Evans on a subsequent torpedo attack.

The Johnston successfully attacked the Japanese heavy cruiser Kumano, hitting the heavy cruiser with at least 45 5-inch (127 mm) shells, before Evans ordered the torpedo battery to be launched. At least one, but more likely two or three hit Kumano's bow, blowing it clean off, forcing Kumano out of the battle along with the heavy cruiser Suzuya, which had to escort the crippled warship. However, celebration was cut short as Evans and his staff were severely injured when Johnston was suddenly blasted almost simultaneously by three 18.1-inch (46 cm) shells and three 6.1-inch (155 mm) shells from the battleship Yamato at a distance of 20,300 yards. In particular, a 6.1-inch (155 mm) shell from Yamato's secondary battery hit the bridge, which blew off two of Evans's fingers and his entire shirt. Despite severe injuries, Evans refused pain killers, instead directing all medical attention to Johnston's crew.

Evans ordered the crippled but not sunk Johnston to continue on, briefly engaging the heavy cruiser Haguro and the battleship Haruna. Noticing the escort carrier Gambier Bay under fire, Johnston briefly fired on the heavy cruiser Chikuma, but was engaged by a destroyer line led by the light cruiser Yahagi. Shell fire left Johnston dead in the water and without a functioning gun. Johnston sank at 10:11, and the destroyer Yukikaze (under Lieutenant Commander Masamichi Terauchi) closed to point blank range, not for an attack, but to salute both Johnston and the crew for their bravery.

The fate of Johnston's captain was never conclusively established, and remains the subject of continuing conjecture among the ship's survivors. Some say that he was hit by Japanese naval shellfire; others that he was able to jump into a damaged motor whaleboat. Terauchi later claimed he saw Evans in a lifeboat returning the salute that the Yukikazes crew rendered as they sailed past. What is known is that he was seriously wounded during the battle; that he lived long enough to give the order to abandon ship; and that he was not among those rescued. Evans was posthumously awarded the Medal of Honor for his material contribution to the decisive victory won in Leyte Gulf, and shared in the Presidential Unit Citation awarded his group for this action in which he was killed. Evans was reported to be on deck ordering to abandon ship, this was the last time he was ever seen.

== Namesake ==
In 1955, the destroyer escort USS Evans (DE-1023) was named in Evans' honor. It was decommissioned in 1968, and no active ship carries the name of Evans or Johnston, although a number of active ships have been named for Samuel B. Roberts and her crew. On November 12, 2013, a petition was started to name a ship after Evans.

On May 23, 2013, the Naval Station Newport, Newport, Rhode Island, Surface Warfare Officers School's virtual simulator for shiphandling training was dedicated as the Evans Full Mission-2 Simulator in Evans' honor.

On Nov. 15, 2023, U.S. Secretary of the Navy Carlos Del Toro announced another ship would be named after Evans. The ship, to be known as DDG-141, will be an Arleigh Burke-class destroyer.

== Awards ==

Medal of Honor
Bronze Star Medal	Purple Heart	Presidential Unit Citation
China Service Medal	American Defense Service Medal w/ Fleet Clasp (3/16" Bronze Star)	American Campaign Medal
Asiatic-Pacific Campaign Medal w/ one 3/16" Silver Star and one 3/16" Bronze Star	World War II Victory Medal	Philippine Liberation Medal w/ one 3/16" Bronze Star

=== Medal of Honor citation ===
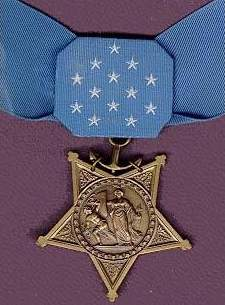
Medal of Honor

For conspicuous gallantry and intrepidity at the risk of his life above and beyond the call of duty as commanding officer of the U.S.S. Johnston in action against major units of the enemy Japanese fleet during the battle off Samar on 25 October 1944. The first to lay a smokescreen and to open fire as an enemy task force, vastly superior in number, firepower and armor, rapidly approached. Comdr. Evans gallantly diverted the powerful blasts of hostile guns from the lightly armed and armored carriers under his protection, launching the first torpedo attack when the Johnston came under straddling Japanese shellfire. Undaunted by damage sustained under the terrific volume of fire, he unhesitatingly joined others of his group to provide fire support during subsequent torpedo attacks against the Japanese and, outshooting and outmaneuvering the enemy as he consistently interposed his vessel between the hostile fleet units and our carriers despite the crippling loss of engine power and communications with steering aft, shifted command to the fantail, shouted steering orders through an open hatch to men turning the rudder by hand and battled furiously until the Johnston, burning and shuddering from a mortal blow, lay dead in the water after 3 hours of fierce combat. Seriously wounded early in the engagement, Comdr. Evans, by his indomitable courage and brilliant professional skill, aided materially in turning back the enemy during a critical phase of the action. His valiant fighting spirit throughout this historic battle will venture as an inspiration to all who served with him.

== See also ==
- List of Medal of Honor recipients for World War II
