= USS Evans (DE-1023) =

Dealey-class destroyer escort

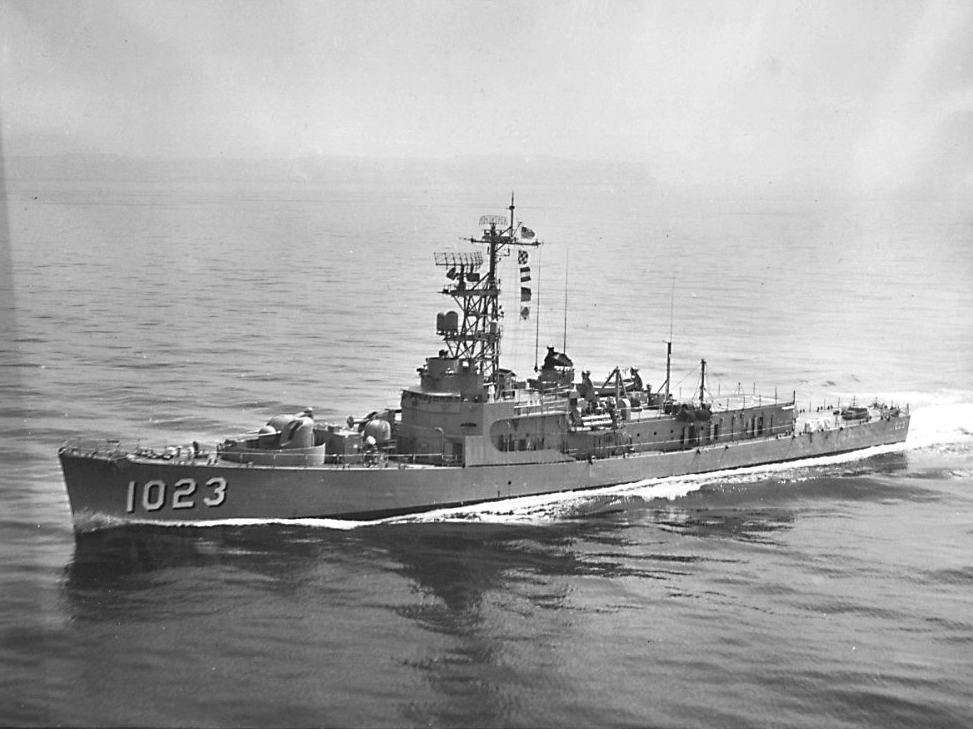

History

United States
- Name: USS Evans
- Namesake: Ernest E. Evans
- Builder: Puget Sound Bridge and Dredging Company
- Laid down: 8 April 1955
- Launched: 14 September 1955
- Sponsored by: Mrs. Hugh Hendrickson
- Commissioned: 14 June 1957
- Decommissioned: 3 December 1968
- Stricken: 12 December 1973
- Home port: San Diego, California
- Motto: "Uletsu-Ya-Sti" (Bold Warrior, in Cherokee)
- Fate: Sold for scrapping 16 August 1974

General characteristics
- Class & type: Dealey-class destroyer escort
- Displacement: 1,270 long tons (1,290 t)
- Length: 314 ft 6 in (95.86 m)
- Beam: 36 ft 9 in (11.20 m)
- Draft: 18 ft (5.5 m)
- Propulsion: 2 × Foster-Wheeler boilers; 1 × De Laval geared turbine; 20,000 shp (15 MW); 1 shaft
- Speed: 25 knots (29 mph; 46 km/h)
- Complement: 170
- Armament: 4 × 3-inch/50 caliber guns; 1 × Mk 108 ASW rocket launcher; 6 × 324 mm (12.8 in) Mark 32 torpedo tubes (3×2); Mark 46 torpedoes

USS Evans (DE-1023), a Dealey-class destroyer escort, was the third ship of the United States Navy to have the name Evans. However, it was the first to be named specifically for Ernest E. Evans, a naval officer and recipient of the Medal of Honor. Unusually, the next will use his full name, rather than reusing "USS Evans".

The third Evans (DE-1023) was launched 14 September 1955 by Puget Sound Bridge and Dredging Company, Seattle, Washington; sponsored by Mrs. High Hendrickson, sister of Ernest E. Evans; and commissioned 14 June 1957.

== Operational service ==
Evans arrived at San Diego, her home port, 4 August 1957, and began shakedown operations along the west coast. Her first lengthy deployment, from 21 January 1958 to 27 June, found her serving with Commander, Naval Forces Marianas, for duty in the administration of Pacific territories held by the United States in trust under the United Nations. She proceeded to visit Japan, Hong Kong, and the Philippines, and to train with ships of the navy of the Republic of Korea.

During her second tour of duty in the Far East, from 8 January 1959 to 13 June, Evans was in Leyte Gulf 7 February to conduct memorial services for her namesake, Commander Ernest Evans. She exercised with the navy of the Republic of the Philippines, patrolled the Taiwan Strait, served briefly as station ship at Hong Kong, and joined in exercises off Okinawa during the remainder of her tour. On 14 April 1960, Evans again climaxed a west coast training period by sailing for the western Pacific on a tour of duty which continued until 21 July 1960. She then returned to operations off the coast for the remainder of the year. Evans made a WestPac cruise from fall of 1962 to early 1963, stopping in Hawaii, Japan, a signed station ship in Hong Kong 1963, went to Vietnam just after the Tonkin Gulf incident.

Evans departed San Diego on her sixth Westpac deployment in January 1966. She made stops at ports in Hawaii, Japan, Hong Kong, Taiwan and Philippines. Evans served in the Vietnam war zone during parts of March, April and early July 1966.

Evans departed San Diego on her seventh Westpac on 27 March 1967. After stops in Pearl Harbor and Yokosuka, Japan in April, Evans spent the first half of May in the Sea of Japan. After a stop at Sasebo, Japan, Evans went to Yankee Station, off Vietnam by 23 May 1967. Evans left Yankee Station 4 June 1967 and went to Subic Bay, returning to Yankee Station 18 June 1967. On 27 June 1967, she departed Yankee Station and visited Subic Bay and Manila. From 10 to 25 July 1967, Evans participated in Operation Sea Dog, anti-submarine and convoy protection exercise. Evans also carried a Gyrodyne QH-50 DASH anti-submarine unmanned aerial vehicle during Westpac '67. Evans then went to Lingayen Gulf and Bang Saen, Thailand and returned to Yankee Station 2 August 1967. She departed Yankee Station 15 August for Hong Kong, then returned to Sasebo 24 August 1967. Evans Departed Sasebo 6 September and returned to Yankee Station 10 September 1967 after a stop at Kaohsiung, Taiwan. Evans stopped back at Yokosuka, Japan 11 October 1967 before returning to San Diego on 28 October 1967.

In September, 1968, she was assigned to the Naval Reserve Force (NRF) as a unit of Reserve Destroyer Squadron 27 at Seattle, Washington. She was eventually decommissioned on 3 December 1973 and was sold for scrap in 1974.

== Unit awards ==
USS Evans received five Armed Forces Expeditionary Medals and seven Vietnam Service Medals.

=== Armed Forces Expeditionary Medals ===
- 18 June 1960—24 June 1960 G (Quemoy Matsu)
- 29 June 1960—30 June 1960 G
- 23 July 1961—24 July 1961 G
- 2 May 1963—4 May 1963 I (Vietnam)
- 11 August 1964—22 September 1964 I

=== Vietnam Service Medals ===
- 20 March 1966—24 March 1966
- 12 April 1966—27 April 1966
- 1 July 1966—2 July 1966
- 24 May 1967—5 June 1967
- 18 June 1967—27 June 1967
- 2 August 1967—14 August 1967
- 10 September 1967—6 October 1967
