= OCC =

OCC may refer to:

== American colleges ==
- Oakland Community College, Michigan
- Oakton Community College, Illinois
- Ocean County College, New Jersey
- Onondaga Community College, New York
- Orange Coast College, California
- Ozark Christian College, Missouri

== Business and government ==
- Office of the Comptroller of the Currency, a bureau of the U.S. Treasury Department
- Office of Child Care, a part of the U.S. Department of Health and Human Services
- Oklahoma Corporation Commission, public utilities commission of Oklahoma
- Online Compliance Consortium, a regulatory compliance forum for top law firms
- Opportunity cost of capital in finance
- Optical Cable Corporation, a manufacturer of fiber optic and copper datacom cabling and connectivity products
- Options Clearing Corporation, a clearing organization
- Orange County Choppers, a custom motorcycle manufacturer
- Organic composition of capital, a theory in Marxian economics
- Osborne Computer Corporation, an American computer company

== Computing ==
- Occasionally connected computing
- Optimistic concurrency control
- On-chip controller, a power and thermal monitoring component of the IBM's POWER8 processor

== Sports ==
- OC Châteaudun, French association football club
- Oceania Club Championship, an international club competition organised by the Oceania Football Confederation
- Oceania Cycling Confederation, Oceania's branch of the Union Cycliste Internationale
- Ohio Capital Conference
- Ohio Cardinal Conference
- Optimists Cricket Club of central Luxembourg
- Oregon Collegiate Conference, a defunct American college athletics conference.
- Ottawa Curling Club of Canada

== Other uses ==
- Ocean Cruising Club, a UK-based organisation for long-distance yacht cruisers
- Officer Candidates Course, a United States Marine Corps training program
- Official Charts Company, a UK-based company compiling various official UK music record charts
- Ohno continuous casting, a special process to produce oxygen-free copper
- Old Corrugated Cardboard, a fiber grade separated in a materials recovery facility
- Onnuri Community Church, a South Korean megachurch
- Ontario Crafts Council, a Canadian nonprofit arts service organization based in Toronto
- Open Cloud Consortium, a non-profit organization
- Operation Christmas Child, an outreach program run by Samaritan's Purse
- Operations Control Center
- Orange County, California
- Oregon Convention Center, a convention center in Portland, Oregon
- The Oxford Companion to Chess
- Science Communication Observatory (Catalan: Observatori de la Comunicació Científica)
- Francisco de Orellana Airport IATA code
- OOO Combo Change Series, a series of Kamen Rider OOO action figures
- Outdoor & Camping Comfort - occ.bg
- Overnight Capital Cost
