= CSPD =

CSPD may refer to:

- Colorado Springs Police Department, Colorado, U.S.
- Center for the Study of the Public Domain, at Duke University Law School, North Carolina, U.S.
- Client-side persistent data, a term for storing data required by web application
- CSPD (molecule), a chemical reagent for enzyme-linked immunosorbent assay (ELISA) staining
- Calendar of State Papers Domestic, see HMS Royal Oak (1664)
- Christlich-Soziale Partei Deutschlands, see Peter-Michael Diestel
- Civil Status and Passport Department, the government office that issues Jordanian passports
