= USS Santa Fe (CL-60) =

Light cruiser of the United States Navy

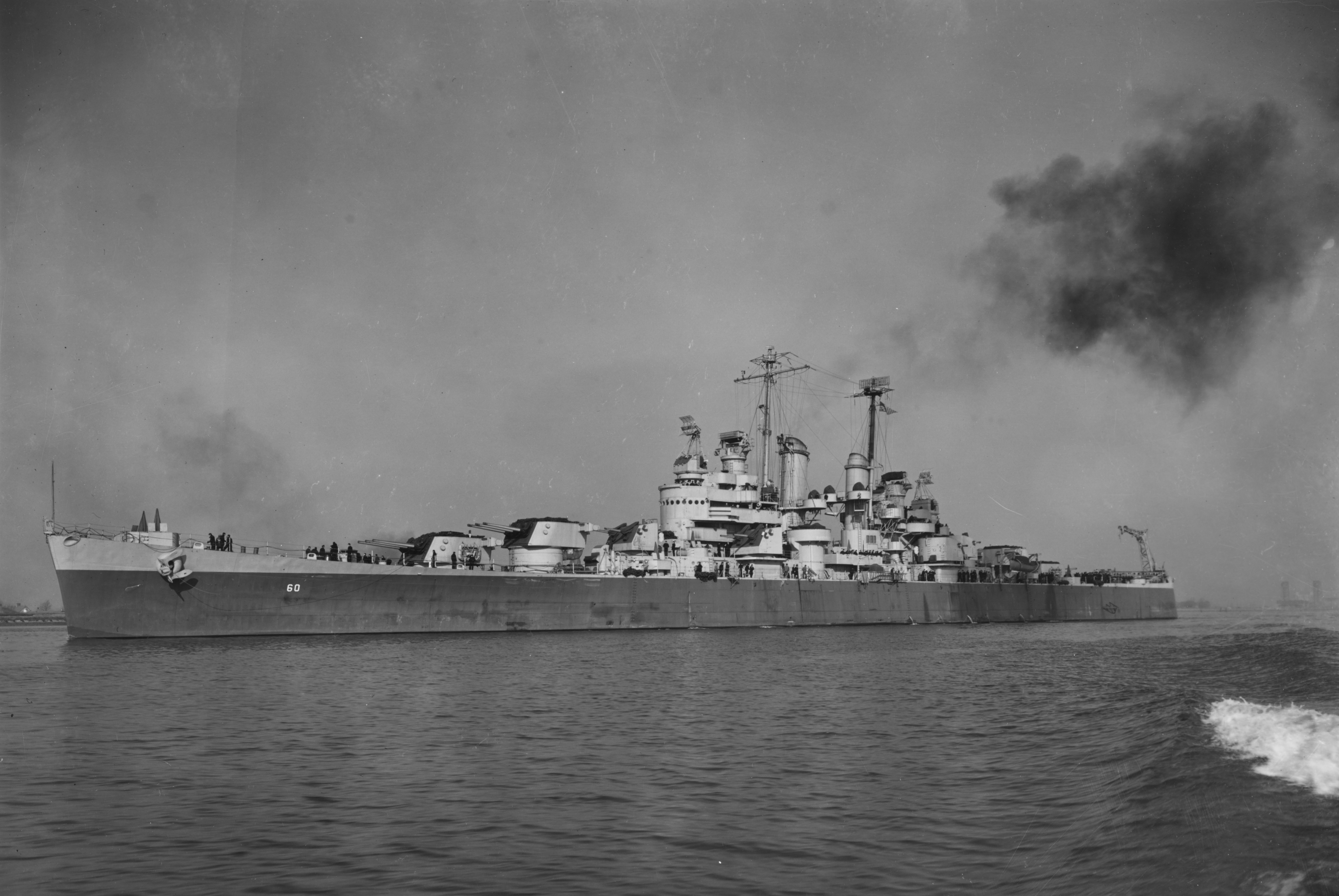
- Santa Fe in January 1943

History

United States
- Name: Santa Fe
- Namesake: City of Santa Fe, New Mexico
- Builder: New York Shipbuilding Corporation
- Laid down: 7 June 1941
- Launched: 10 June 1942
- Commissioned: 24 November 1942
- Decommissioned: 29 October 1946
- Stricken: 1 March 1959
- Fate: Sold for scrap 9 November 1959

General characteristics
- Class & type: Cleveland-class light cruiser
- Displacement: Standard: 11,744 long tons (11,932 t); Full load: 14,131 long tons (14,358 t)
- Length: 610 ft 1 in (185.95 m)
- Beam: 66 ft 4 in (20.22 m)
- Draft: 24 ft 6 in (7.47 m)
- Installed power: 4 × Babcock & Wilcox boilers; 100,000 shp (75,000 kW)
- Propulsion: 4 × steam turbines; 4 × screw propellers
- Speed: 32.5 knots (60.2 km/h; 37.4 mph)
- Range: 11,000 nmi (20,000 km; 13,000 mi) at 15 kn (28 km/h; 17 mph)
- Complement: 1,285 officers and enlisted
- Armament: 12 × 6 in (152 mm) Mark 16 guns; 12 × 5 in (127 mm)/38 caliber guns; 24 × 40 mm (1.6 in) Bofors anti-aircraft guns; 21 × 20 mm (0.79 in) Oerlikon anti-aircraft guns
- Armor: Belt: 3.5–5 in (89–127 mm); Deck: 2 in (51 mm); Barbettes: 6 in (152 mm); Turrets: 6 in (152 mm); Conning Tower: 5 in (127 mm)
- Aircraft carried: 4 × floatplanes
- Aviation facilities: 2 × stern catapults

USS Santa Fe (hull number: CL-60) was a Cleveland-class light cruiser of the United States Navy, which were built during World War II. The class was designed as a development of the earlier Brooklyn-class cruisers, the size of which had been limited by the First London Naval Treaty. The start of the war led to the dissolution of the treaty system, but the dramatic need for new vessels precluded a new design, so the Clevelands used the same hull as their predecessors, but were significantly heavier. The Clevelands carried a main battery of twelve 6-inch (152 mm) guns in four three-gun turrets, along with a secondary armament of twelve 5 in (127 mm) dual-purpose guns. They had a top speed of 32.5 knots (60.2 km/h; 37.4 mph).

== Design ==
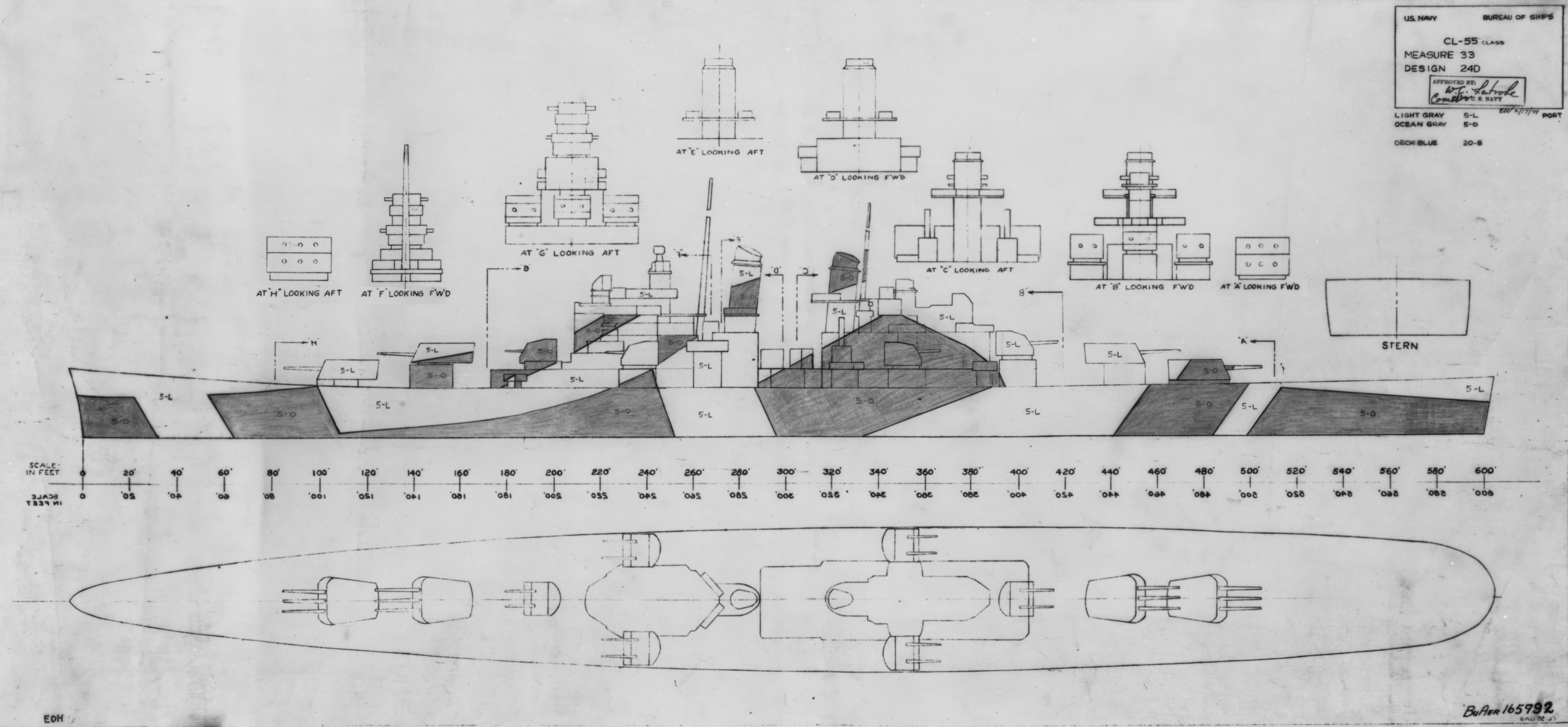
Depiction of the Cleveland class, showing the plan and profile

The Cleveland-class light cruisers traced their origin to design work done in the late 1930s; at the time, light cruiser displacement was limited to 8,000 long tons (8,100 t) by the Second London Naval Treaty. Following the start of World War II in September 1939, Britain announced it would suspend the treaty for the duration of the conflict, a decision the US Navy quickly followed. Though still neutral, the United States recognized that war was likely and the urgent need for additional ships ruled out an entirely new design, so the Clevelands were a close development of the earlier Brooklyn-class cruisers, the chief difference being the substitution of a two-gun 5 in (127 mm) dual-purpose gun mount for one of the main battery 6 in (152 mm) gun turrets.

Santa Fe was 610 feet 1 inch (186 m) long overall and had a beam of 66 ft 4 in (20.22 m) and a draft of 24 ft 6 in (7.47 m). Her standard displacement amounted to 11,744 long tons (11,932 t) and increased to 14,131 long tons (14,358 t) at full load. The ship was powered by four General Electric steam turbines, each driving one propeller shaft, using steam provided by four oil-fired Babcock & Wilcox boilers. Rated at 100,000 shaft horsepower (75,000 kW), the turbines were intended to give a top speed of 32.5 knots (60.2 km/h; 37.4 mph). Her crew numbered 1285 officers and enlisted men.

The ship was armed with a main battery of twelve 6 in /47-caliber Mark 16 guns (Note: /47 refers to the length of the gun in terms of calibers. A /47 gun is 47 times long as it is in bore diameter.) in four 3-gun turrets on the centerline. Two were placed forward in a superfiring pair; the other two turrets were placed aft of the superstructure in another superfiring pair. The secondary battery consisted of twelve 5 in (127 mm) /38-caliber dual-purpose guns mounted in twin turrets. Two of these were placed on the centerline, one directly behind the forward main turrets and the other just forward of the aft turrets. Two more were placed abreast of the conning tower and the other pair on either side of the aft superstructure. Anti-aircraft defense consisted of twenty-four Bofors 40 mm (1.6 in) guns in four quadruple and four double mounts and twenty-one Oerlikon 20 mm (0.79 in) guns in single mounts.

The ship's belt armor ranged in thickness from 3.5 to 5 in (89 to 127 mm), with the thicker section amidships where it protected the ammunition magazines and propulsion machinery spaces. Her deck armor was 2 in (51 mm) thick. The main battery turrets were protected with 6.5 in (170 mm) faces and 3 in (76 mm) sides and tops, and they were supported by barbettes 6 inches thick. Santa Fe's conning tower had 5-inch sides.

== Service history ==
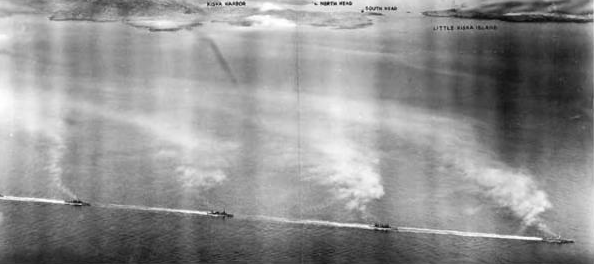
Santa Fe (far left) and three other cruisers bombarding Kiska

Santa Fe was laid down at the New York Shipbuilding Co. at Camden, New Jersey, on 7 June 1941. She was launched of 10 June 1942, and after completing fitting out, she was commissioned on 24 November. Captain Russell S. Berkey served as the ship's first commanding officer. She thereafter conducted her shakedown cruise and initial training off the East Coast of the United States into early 1943, before sailing for the Pacific Ocean, where she joined the forces engaged in the Pacific Theater of World War II. She arrived in Pearl Harbor, Hawaii, on 22 March and proceeded from there to the Aleutian Islands. She arrived in Alaskan waters on 20 April, and six days later she took part in a bombardment of Japanese-held Attu Island. She participated in patrols off the Aleutians for the next four months during the Aleutian Islands campaign, and she shelled Kiska on 6 and 22 July before American forces landed on the island the following month. She provided gunfire support to the forces that went ashore there on 15 August. Ten days later, Santa Fe left the area and arrived back in Pearl Harbor on 1 September.

=== Gilbert and Marshall Islands campaign ===
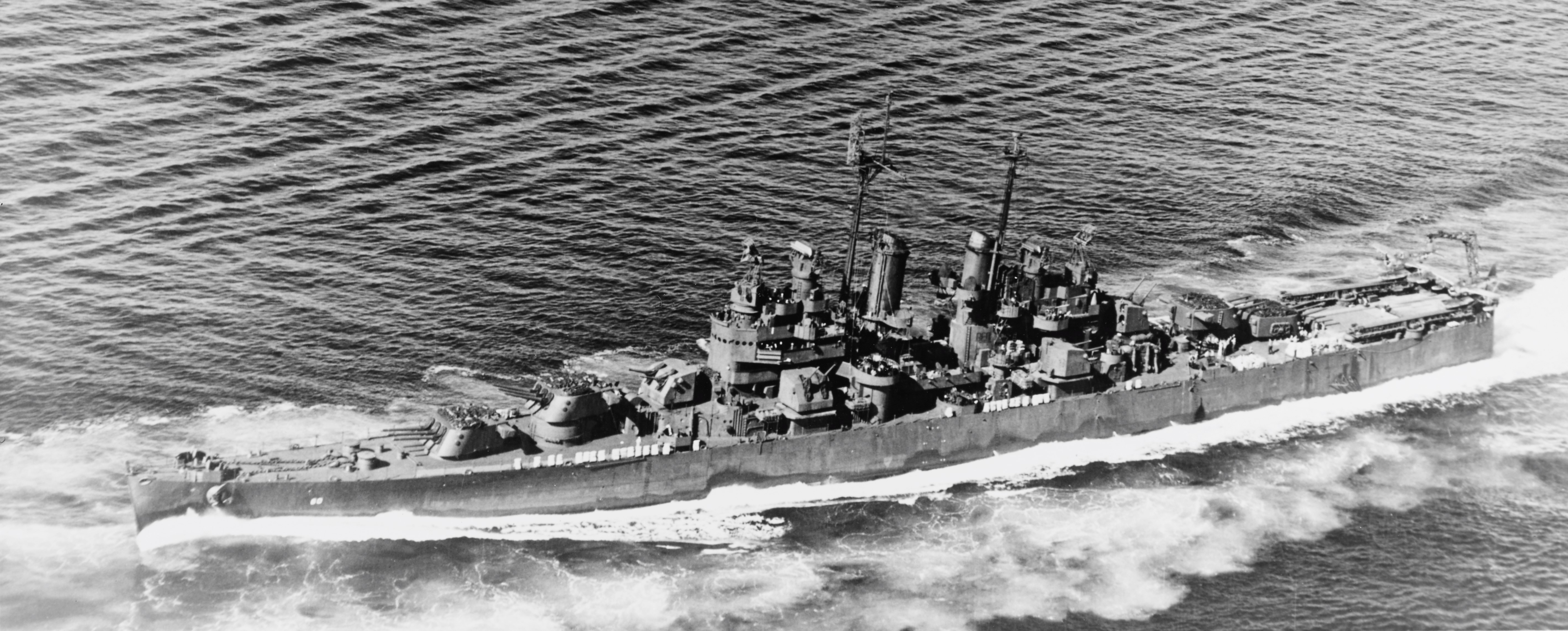
Santa Fe underway in January 1944, before joining the Gilbert and Marshall Islands campaign

The ship next joined Cruiser Division 13, which was attached to support the Fast Carrier Task Force. She joined a raid by the fleet's aircraft carriers on Tarawa on 18–19 September and then an attack on Wake Island on 5–6 October. Santa Fe also bombarded Wake and disabled Japanese coastal artillery batteries. On 21 October, she got underway with the Fast Carrier Task Force, but while en route, Santa Fe was detached to cover troop ships sailing for Bougainville. They arrived there on 7 November; Santa Fe remained there to protect the transports as they unloaded their cargoes. She helped to defend the vessels during heavy Japanese air attacks over the next two days before departing for Espiritu Santo. On 14 November, she sortied as part of the escort for the invasion fleet for the Gilbert and Marshall Islands campaign. Santa Fe shelled Tarawa from 20 to 22 November, during the Battle of Tarawa. She left on 26 November to rejoin the Fast Carrier Task Force, which began the next phase of the campaign with air strikes on Kwajalein on 4 December. The fleet returned to Pearl Harbor on 9 December.

In late 1943, Santa Fe arrived back in the United States to begin preparations to join the Gilbert and Marshall Islands campaign. She took part in amphibious assault exercises off San Pedro, California, in January 1944, and on 13 January, she got underway with the invasion fleet. Santa Fe and several other vessels sailed ahead of the fleet to bombard Wotje Atoll on 30 January to prepare for the invasion of Kwajalein, which was to take place the following day. The ship then returned to the invasion fleet to support the marines as they went ashore on Kwajalein. The ship remained offshore through 1 February to bombard Japanese forces as the Americans fought their way across the island, before departing for Majuro, arriving there on 7 February.

On 12 February, Santa Fe sortied as part of the escort for the Fast Carrier Task Force, which raided Truk on 16–17 February and then Saipan on 22 February. The ships then passed back through Majuro for Espiritu Santo, where they replenished for the next major operation. She sortied again on 15 March, accompanying the carriers Enterprise and Belleau Wood, to support the landing on Emirau, which took place unopposed five days later. On 30 March and 1 April, she covered the carriers while they struck Japanese positions on Palau, Yap, and Woleai. By 13 April, she had transferred to a task group centered on the carrier Hornet, which was sent to western New Guinea to support Allied ground operations there, including the Battle of Hollandia. The group raided Wakde and Sawar on 21 April, including a bombardment by Santa Fe and other elements of the carrier screen. On 28 April, the task group was sent north to raid Truk, Satawan, and Pohnpei from 29 April to 1 May. Three days later, they arrived back in Kwajalein.

=== Mariana and Palau Islands campaign ===
Santa Fe next joined a task group led by the carrier Bunker Hill, which sortied in June to begin the Mariana and Palau Islands campaign. These began with a series of air strikes on Saipan, Tinian, and Guam from 11 to 16 June during the initial operation, the invasion of Saipan. The American offensive prompted a major response by Japan's fleet, which led to the Battle of the Philippine Sea. Japanese carrier aircraft struck first, on the morning of 19 June, and Santa Fe contributed her anti-aircraft fire to driving off the attackers. American ships and aircraft inflicted serious losses on Japanese carrier aircraft, and the next day, American carrier planes struck the withdrawing Japanese fleet late in the day. To help guide the returning planes in the darkness, Santa Fe used her searchlights, despite the risk of illuminating herself to Japanese submarines that might be in the area. Bunker Hill joined air strikes on Pagan Island on 24 June, after which the task group returned to Eniwetok three days later to rearm and refuel.

On 30 June, Santa Fe got underway again, this time again accompanying Hornet. The carriers struck Iwo Jima, and Santa Fe and other warships bombarded the island on 4 July. The ships then turned back south to resume attacks in the Marianas, and from 6 to 21 July, they attacked Japanese airfields between Guam and Rota to prevent them from interfering with the planned invasion of Guam. The carriers then struck the islands of Yap and Ulithi before returning to Saipan, which had since been seized by American forces. Later that day, the task force sortied again for another attack on Iwo Jima. Two days later, Santa Fe and other vessels encountered a Japanese convoy escorted by the destroyer Matsu; they sank Matsu and several transports of the convoy. The next day, the ships bombarded Iwo Jima again. They then sailed for Eniwetok, arriving there on 11 July. There, Santa Fe transferred to a task group centered on the carrier Essex. They next sortied to carry out strikes on Peleliu from 6 to 8 September, in preparation for the invasion of Peleliu scheduled for the following week. The carriers then shifted to targets in Mindanao in the southern Philippines on 9 and 10 September to prevent them from interfering with the Peleliu operation. Santa Fe and other cruisers intercepted another Japanese convoy on 9 September and sank several vessels. The carriers raided Japanese positions in the area from 12 to 14 September and again from 21 to 24 September, before withdrawing to the Kossol Roads in the Palau islands to replenish.

=== Philippines campaign ===
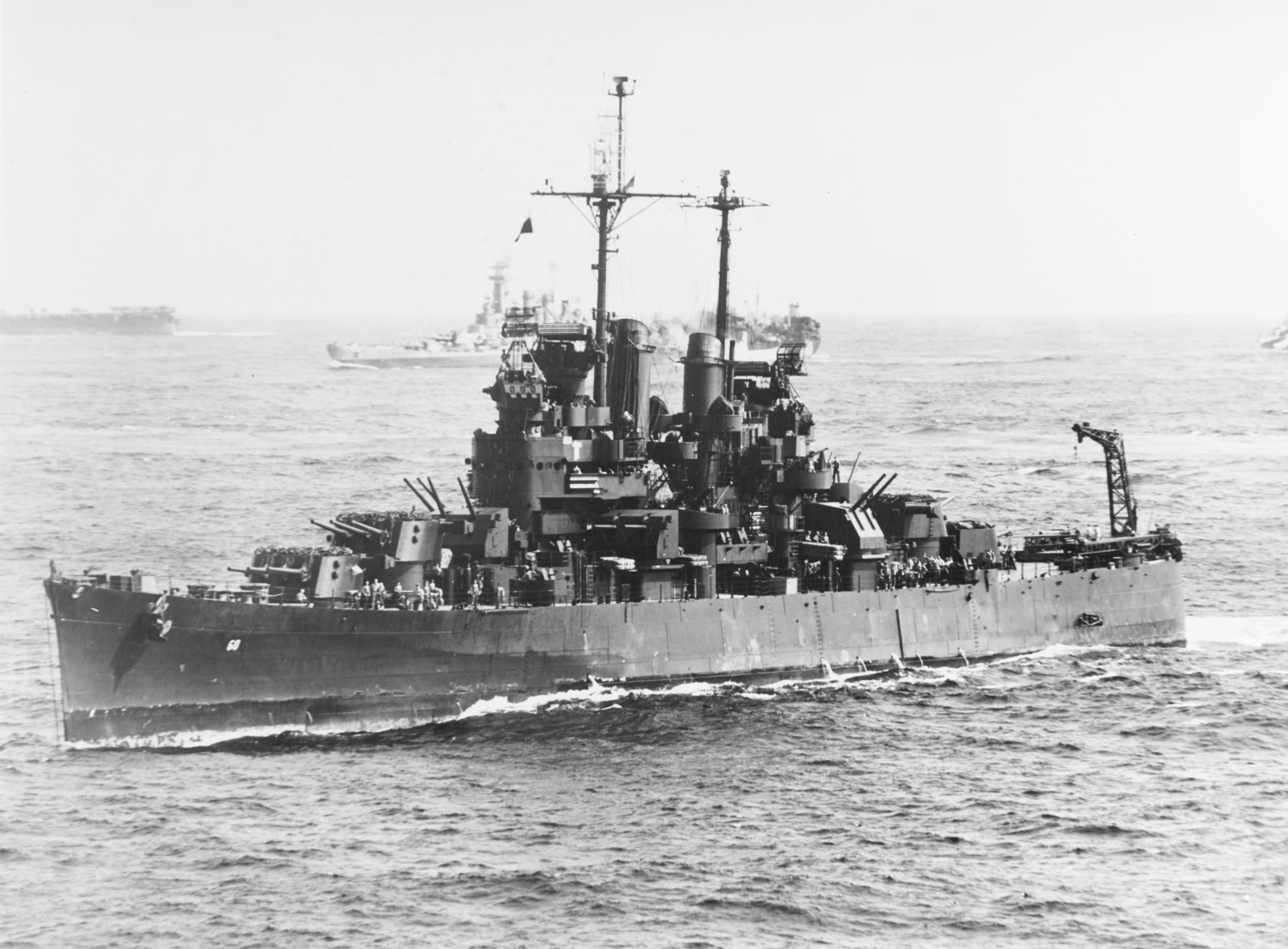
USS Santa Fe (CL-60), Philippines campaign, 12 December 1944

As the American fleet began preparations for the Philippines campaign, the Fast Carrier Task Force carried out a series of strikes on Japanese airfields on Okinawa and Formosa from 10 to 13 October. During the Formosa Air Battle on 13 October, Santa Fe and her sister ships Birmingham and Mobile were sent to cover the withdrawal of their sister Houston and the heavy cruiser Canberra, which had been badly damaged in Japanese air attacks. Four days later, Santa Fe arrived back with the carriers to cover them during the invasion of Leyte.

Santa Fe's task group then moved on to launch air strikes on Japanese airfields in the Visayas on 21 October. The next day, they withdrew to refuel before searching for Japanese naval forces that were reportedly in the area over 23 and 24 October. Later on the 24th, Japanese aircraft launched a major attack on the fleet that was defeated, and that evening, the Japanese carriers of the Northern Force were detected. The American fleet turned north to intercept them, and early the next morning, a force of six fast battleships and seven cruisers—including Santa Fe—were detached to pursue the Japanese carriers to try to catch them in a surface action. The American carriers also launched air strikes against the Northern Force, but later that day, reports of the battleships and cruisers of the Center Force attacking the invasion fleet prompted the Americans to detach most of their surface forces to try to block the Japanese battleships. Santa Fe and three other cruisers remained with the Fast Carrier Task Force to sink damaged vessels of the Northern Force, which included the carrier Chiyoda and the destroyer Hatsuzuki. The carrier task groups re-formed the next day and sailed for Ulithi, arriving there on 30 October.

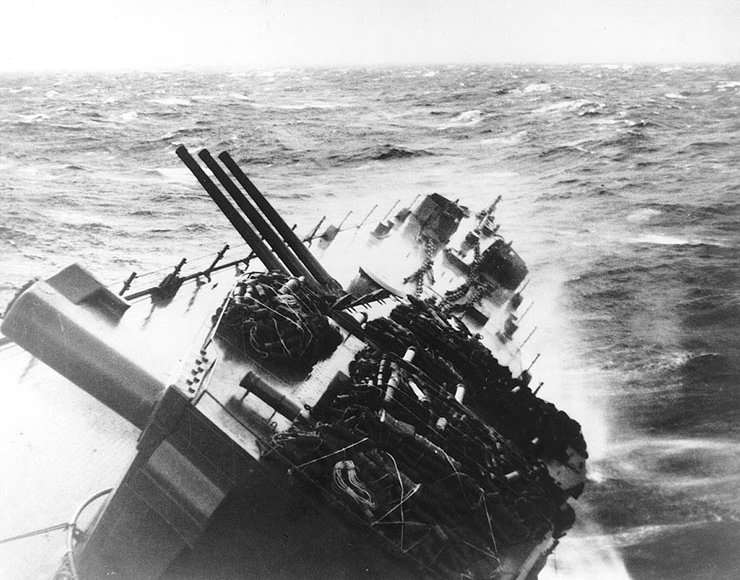
Santa Fe during Typhoon Cobra, December 1944

Santa Fe's task group sailed on 1 November, bound for Manus, where the ships were to undergo maintenance. The ships were quickly recalled after reports of Japanese warships off Leyte, though this proved to be false. The American fleet and forces ashore came under heavy air attack, however, so the task group was kept in the area to help defend American units. The task group's carriers launched retaliatory air strikes on Manila, the capital of the Philippines, on 5 and 6 November, followed by another round of strikes on other targets from 11 to 14 November. Three days later, the ships returned to Ulithi for replenishment. On 20 November, Japanese midget submarines entered the anchorage and sank the oiler Mississinewa. Santa Fe sent her floatplanes to pick up survivors from the sinking.

On 22 November, the task group sortied once again for attacks on Japanese positions in the Philippines, which began three days later. They remained in action off the Philippines until 1 December, when they departed for another period of rest and replenishment at Ulithi. By mid-month, they had joined the forces supporting the landing on Mindoro. On 18 and 19 December, Typhoon Cobra struck the fleet, sinking three destroyers. Santa Fe and other vessels searched for survivors before returning to Ulithi on 24 December. They remained there until 30 December, when the task group got underway to carry out a raid of Japanese airfields on Okinawa and Formosa on 3 and 4 January 1945. On 6 January, they turned south to strike targets on Luzon in the Philippines in preparation for the planned invasion of Lingayen Gulf. Attacks on Japanese airfields in the region continued through 9 January, after which the Fast Carrier Task Force sailed south to launch the South China Sea raid. On 21 January, strikes on Formosa resumed, followed by more attacks on Okinawa the following day. The fleet returned to Ulithi on 26 January to replenish.

=== Iwo Jima and Okinawa campaigns ===
Santa Fe and the rest of her task group sortied on 10 February to attack airfields in the Tokyo area to neutralize aircraft that would interfere with the impending invasion of Iwo Jima. The carriers launched their raids on 16 and 17 February, and the next day, after sailing south to Iwo Jima, Santa Fe was detached to carry out bombardments of Japanese positions on the island. She shelled Japanese defenses from 19 to 21 February, including coastal artillery batteries on Mount Suribachi; she also fired star shells to illuminate targets at night. By 25 February, she had returned to her task group to cover the carriers for another attack on the Tokyo area. The ships thereafter returned to Ulithi for replenishment.

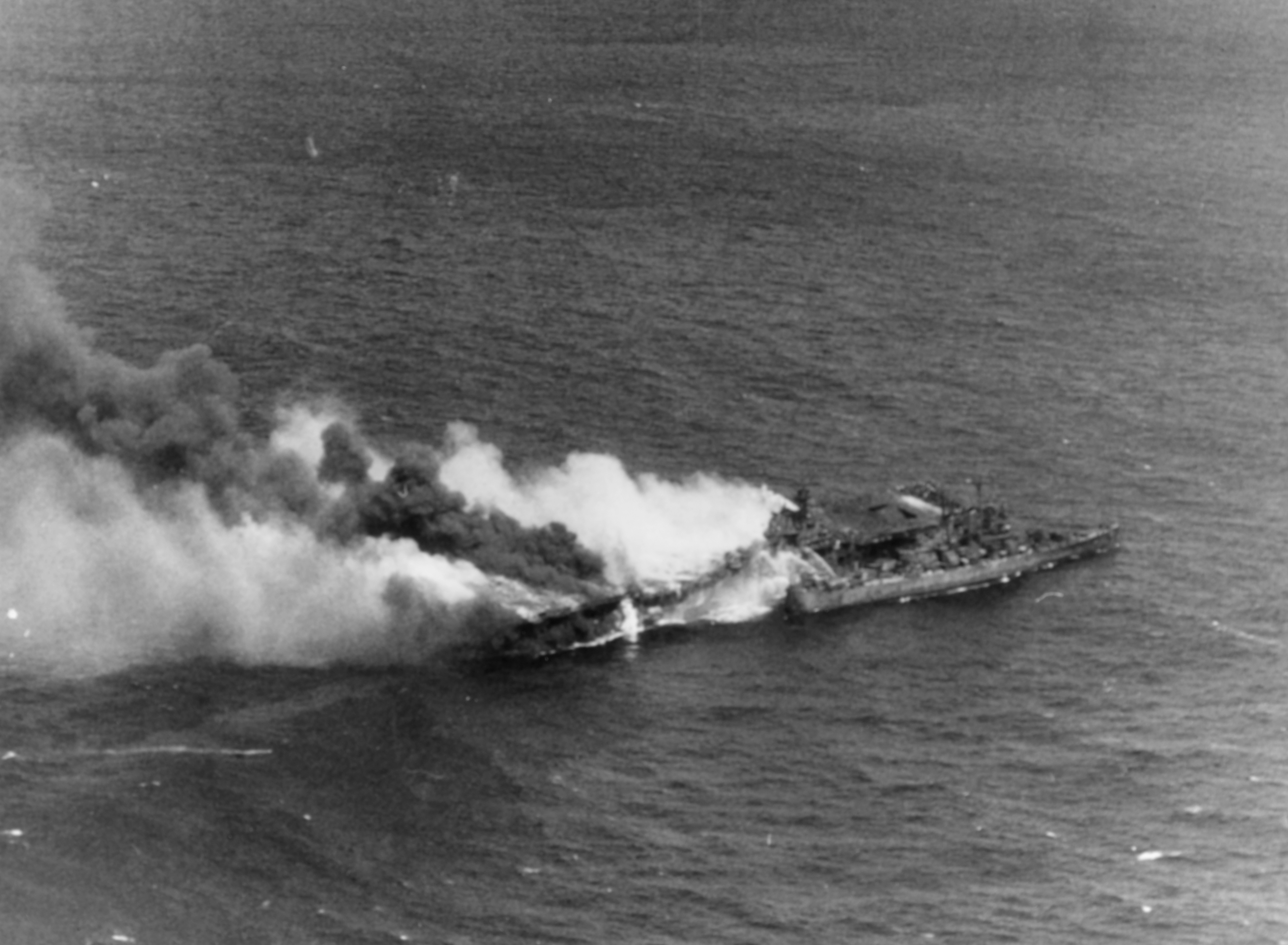
Santa Fe alongside the burning carrier Franklin, helping to fight the fires

The ship was transferred to the task group centered on the carrier Hancock on 14 March; four days later, the ships were off Japan for another round of strikes on installations on Kyushu, this time including the naval bases at Kure and Kobe, where the carrier aircraft attacked some of the remaining elements of the Japanese fleet on 19 March. That day, while the carriers were in the process of launching their strike planes, a Japanese bomber hit the carrier Franklin with a pair of bombs, starting serious fires. Several loaded aircraft were clustered on the flight deck, which quickly caught fire as well and contributed to the explosions that badly damaged the carrier. Santa Fe came alongside to assist with rescue efforts and to help suppress the fires. After about three hours, the fires were under control, and some 833 men had been evacuated from Franklin. Santa Fe was also damaged in the course of assisting Franklin, and both ships withdrew to Ulithi; the carrier had to be taken under tow by the heavy cruiser Pittsburgh. Santa Fe and Franklin then left Ulithi on 27 March, bound for Pearl Harbor. Santa Fe received a Navy Unit Commendation for her crew's efforts in saving Franklin. The ship's commander, Captain Harold Fitz, was awarded the Navy Cross. and three crewmen were awarded Silver Stars for risking their own lives to rescue men from Franklin who were in the water.

Santa Fe proceeded on to San Pedro, California, where she underwent an overhaul that lasted from 10 April to 14 July. She thereafter got underway to rejoin the fleet, arriving in Pearl Harbor on 1 August. She joined the carrier Antietam and Birmingham; the ships were ordered to attack Wake Island, but the orders were cancelled after Japan announced it would surrender on 15 August. The ships instead sailed on to Eniwetok and then continuing on to Okinawa, arriving in Buckner Bay on 26 August. Santa Fe sailed to Sasebo, Japan, on 20 September, and from 17 October to 10 November, she took part in the occupation of Hokkaido and northern Honshu. From 10 November, she was assigned to Operation Magic Carpet, the effort to repatriate American soldiers, sailors, and marines. Santa Fe brought home men from Saipan, Guam, and Truk over the course of two voyages. The ship received thirteen battle stars for her wartime service.

Santa Fe thereafter sailed to Bremerton, Washington, on 25 January 1946. She was decommissioned there on 19 October and assigned to the Bremerton Group of the Pacific Reserve Fleet, where she remained for the next thirteen years. She was ultimately struck from the Naval Vessel Register on 1 March 1959 and sold for scrap on 9 November to Zidell Explorations, Inc., where she was broken up.
