= Leyte Gulf order of battle =

Overview of the Order of Battle for Leyte Gulf

IJ Combined Fleet and US Pacific Fleet Commanders

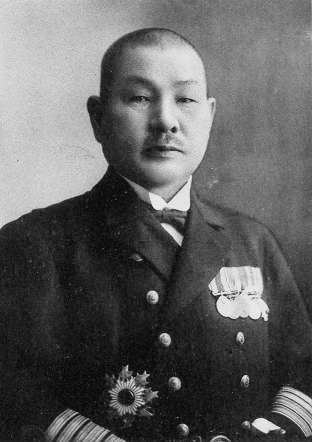
Adm. Soemu Toyoda (HQ at Yokohama)

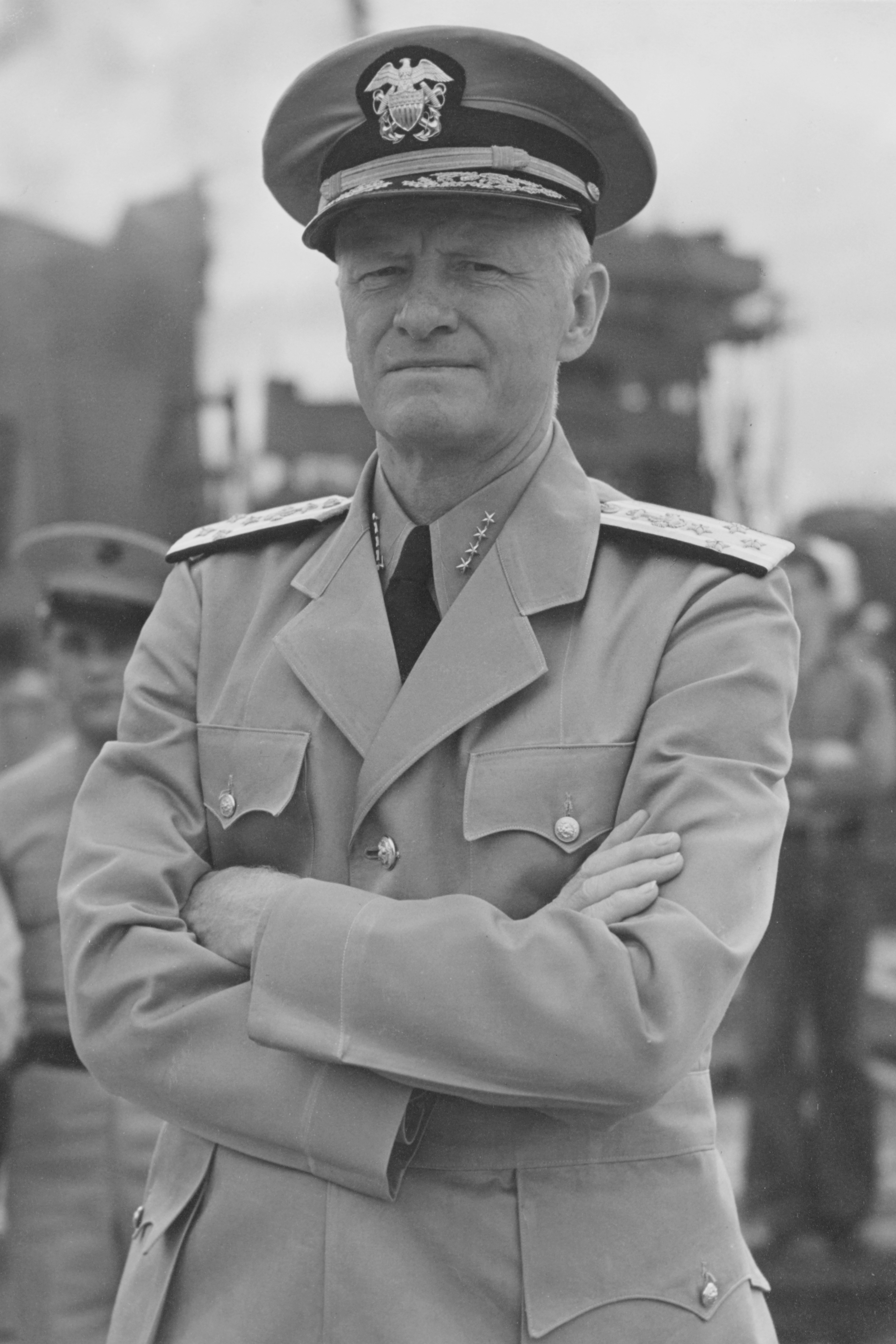
Adm. Chester W. Nimitz (HQ at Pearl Harbor)

The Battle of Leyte Gulf, generally considered to be the largest naval combat in history, was fought 24–25 October 1944 in the waters of the Philippine Islands by elements of the Imperial Japanese Navy's Combined Fleet (bringing together the IJN's 2nd Fleet, 3rd Fleet and 5th Fleet) and the United States Navy's Pacific Fleet (bringing together the USN's 3rd Fleet and 7th Fleet). Of the five separate engagements that made up the battle as a whole, the forces involved in the three principal ones are listed here.

US Seventh and Third Fleet Commanders

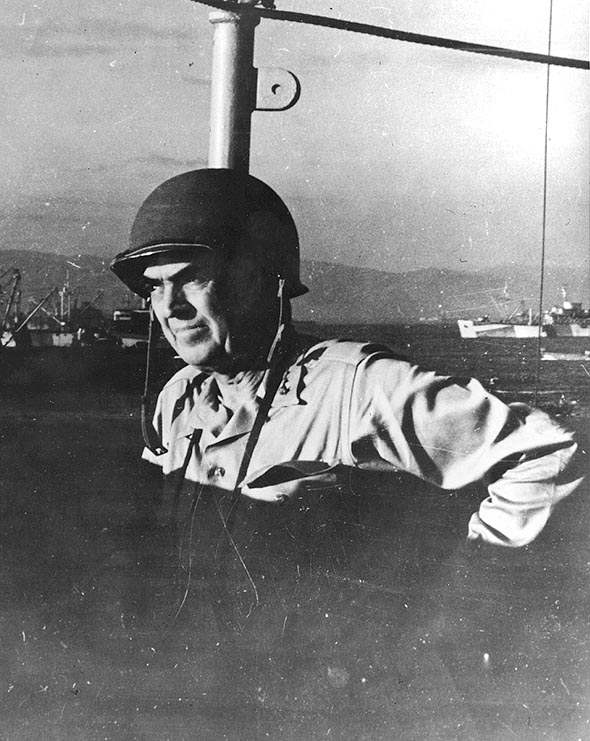
Vice Adm. Thomas C. Kinkaid

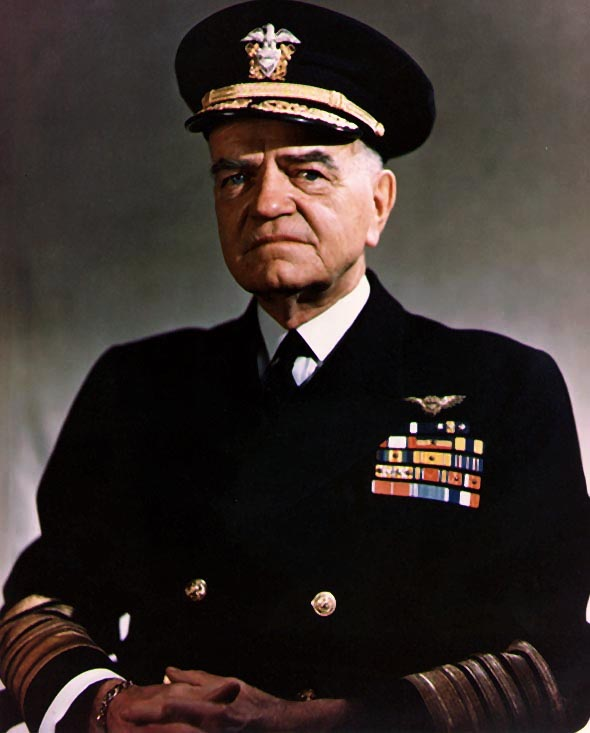
Admiral William F. Halsey, Jr.

Since the Japanese assumed the tactical initiative in all three actions, their forces are listed first in each section.

Losses in these three actions
IJN: 1 fleet carrier, 3 light carriers, 2 old battleships, 3 heavy cruisers, 3 light cruisers, 9 destroyers, 1 oiler
USN: 2 escort carriers, 2 destroyers, 1 destroyer escort

- The light aircraft carrier USS Princeton was heavily damaged and scuttled with great loss of life on 24 October while engaging in battle against land-based Japanese aircraft flying into the Leyte area east of Luzon. The loss of Princeton is always included in the casualties of the Battle of Leyte Gulf.

== 24–25 Oct – Battle of Surigao Strait ==
(according to Tully, Anthony (2009). Battle of Surigao Strait. Bloomington, IN: Indiana University Press. ISBN 978-0-253-35242-2.)

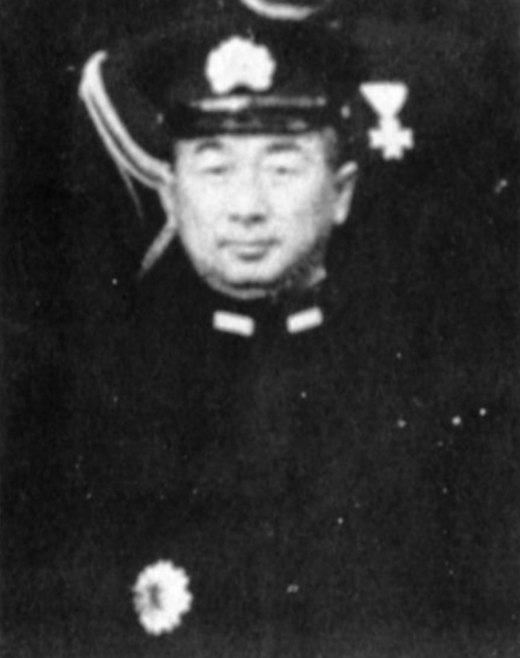
Vice Adm. Shōji Nishimura (KIA)

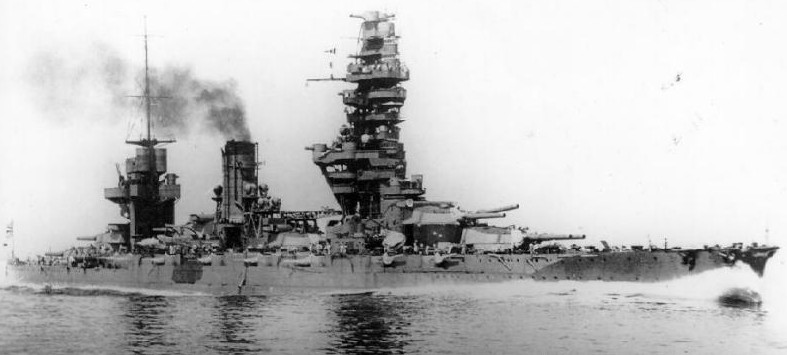
Battleship Fusō

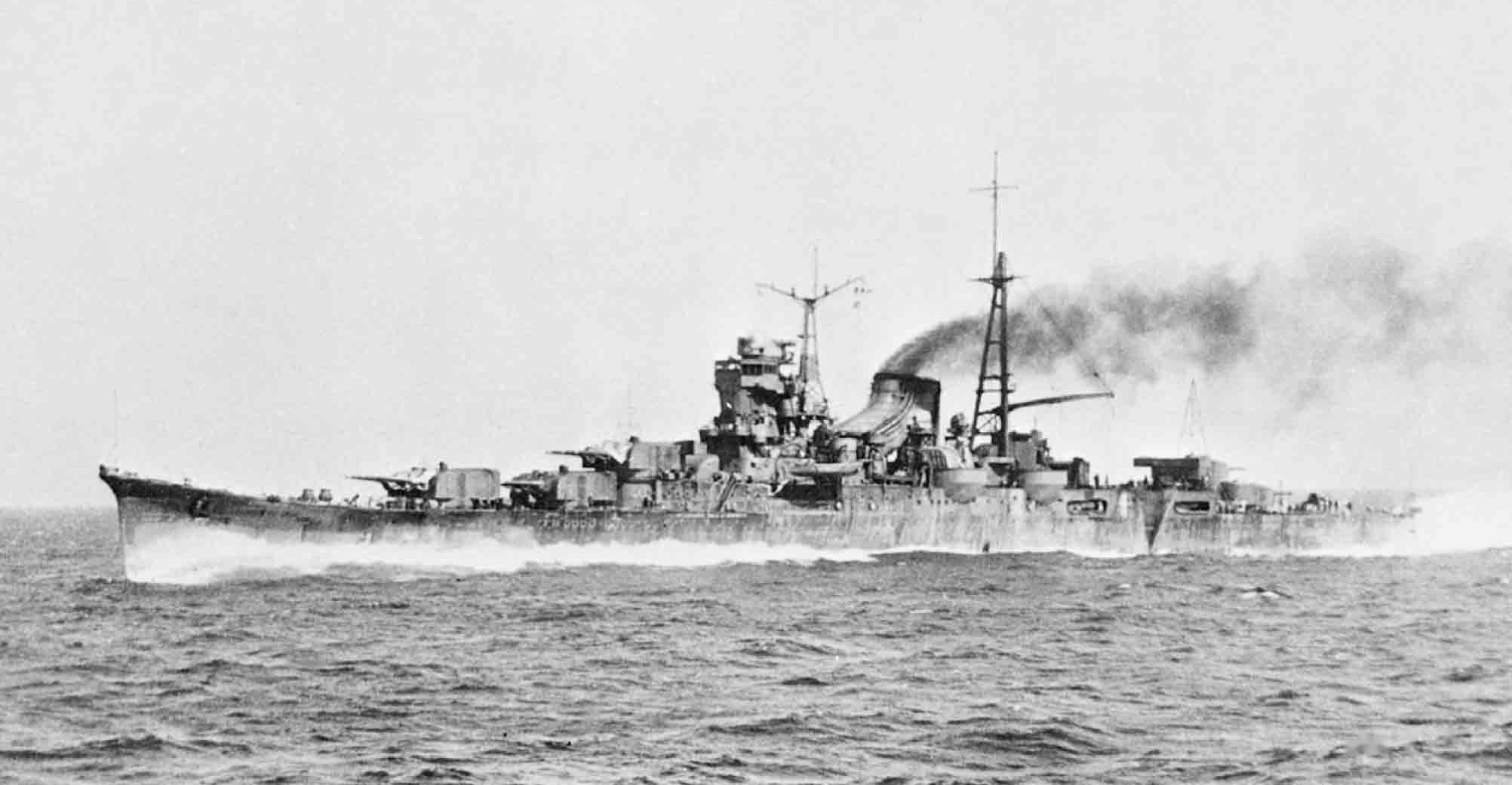
Heavy cruiser Mogami

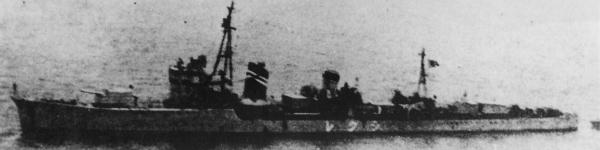
Destroyer Shigure, sole survivor of Nishimura's force

=== Japanese Forces ===
Southern Force ('Force C')
Vice Admiral Shōji Nishimura (killed during the battle) in battleship Yamashiro

Force C (sortied from Brunei Bay 22 Oct)
Vice Adm. Nishimura (KIA)

Battleship Division 2 (Vice Adm. Nishimura – KIA)

2 Fusō-class old battleships (12 × 14-in. main battery)

Fusō (sunk by torpedoes 25 Oct), Yamashiro (sunk by gunfire 25 Oct)

1 Mogami-class heavy cruiser (6 × 8-in. main battery)

Mogami (damaged by gunfire and air attacks, scuttled 25 Oct)

Destroyer Division 4 (Capt. Kameshirou Takahashi) (KIA)

3 Asashio-class destroyers (6 × 5-in. main battery)

Michishio (sunk by torpedo and gunfire 25 Oct), Yamagumo (sunk by torpedo 25 Oct), Asagumo (sunk by torpedo and gunfire 25 Oct)

1 Shiratsuyu-class destroyer (5 × 5-in. main battery)

Shigure

Second Striking Force (Note: Shima arrived in Surigao Strait after the devastation of Force C. Unable to make contact with Nishimura, who was dead by that time, Shima made a perfunctory attack and retired. "Shima had unusual discretion for a Japanese admiral." (Morison 1958, p. 233)) (sortied from Pescadores, Formosa 22 Oct)
Vice Admiral Kiyohide Shima in heavy cruiser Nachi

Cruiser Division 21 (Vice Admiral Shima)

2 Myōkō-class heavy cruisers (10 × 8-in. main battery)

Nachi, Ashigara

Destroyer Squadron 1 (Rear Adm. Masatomi Kimura)

1 Nagara-class light cruiser (7 × 5.5-in. main battery)

Abukuma (sunk by air attack 26 Oct)

4 destroyers

2 Fubuki-class (6 × 5-in. main battery)

Akebono, Ushio

1 Asashio-class (6 × 5-in. main battery)

Kasumi

1 Kagero-class (6 × 5-in. main battery)

Shiranui (sunk by air attack 27 Oct)

=== American Forces ===
Task Force 77 and Surigao Strait Commanders

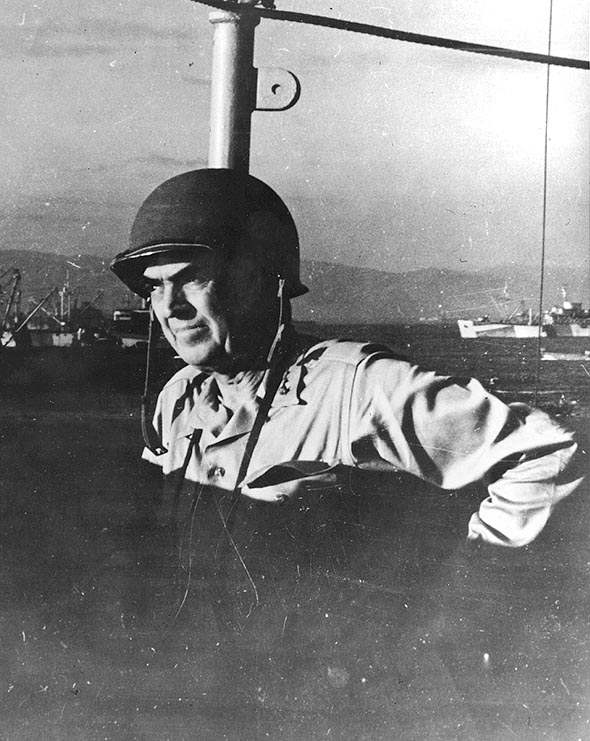
Vice Adm. Thomas C. Kinkaid

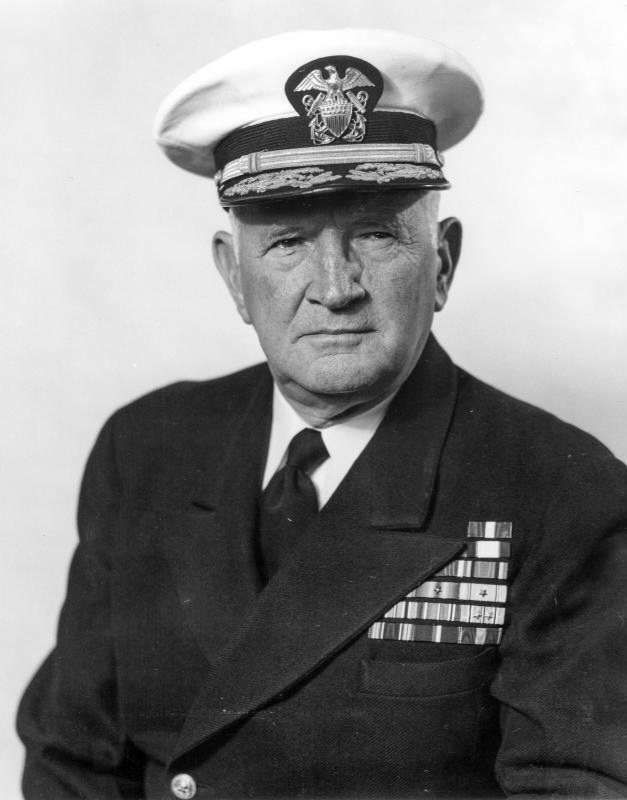
Rear Adm. Jesse B. Oldendorf

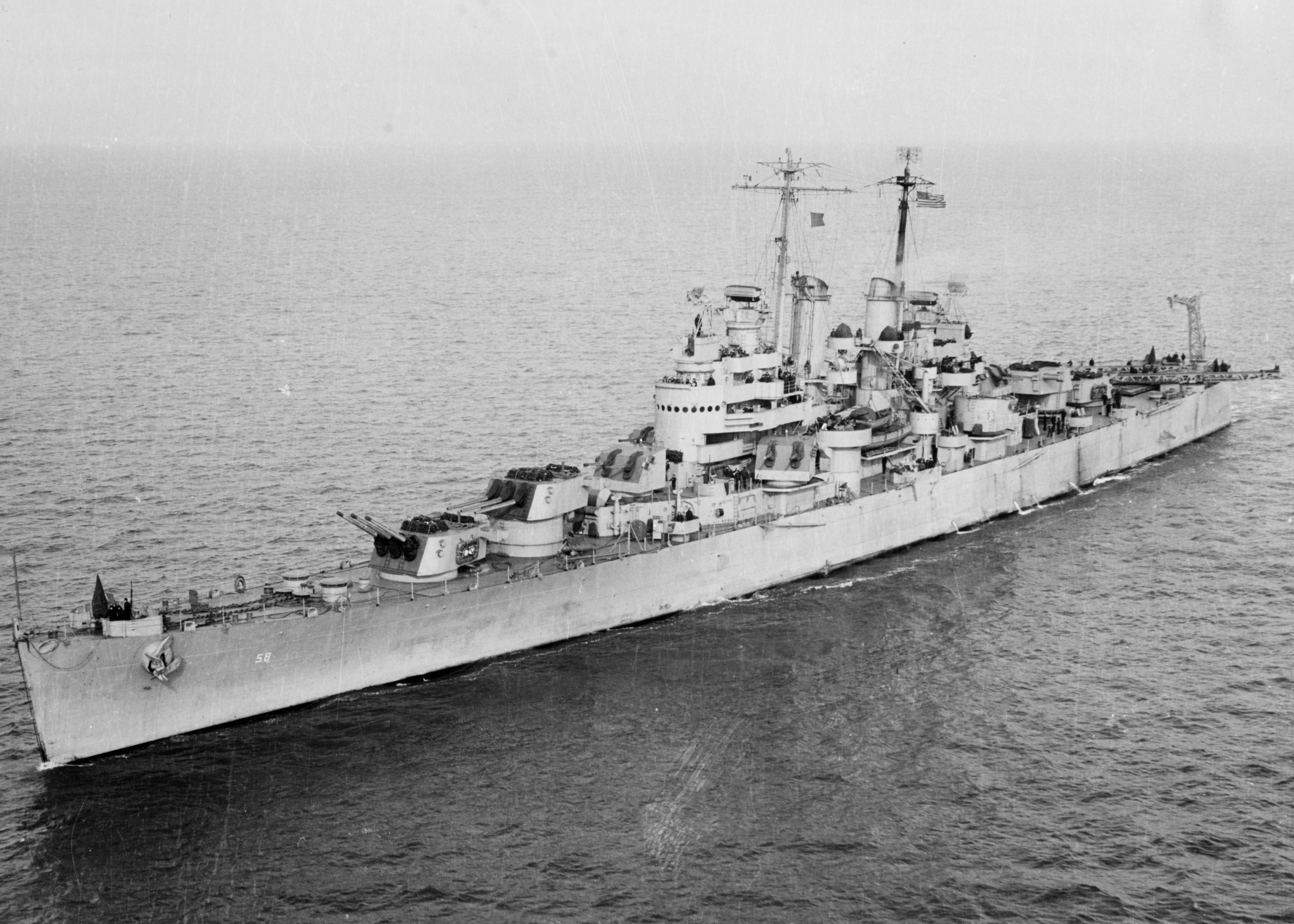
Light cruiser Denver

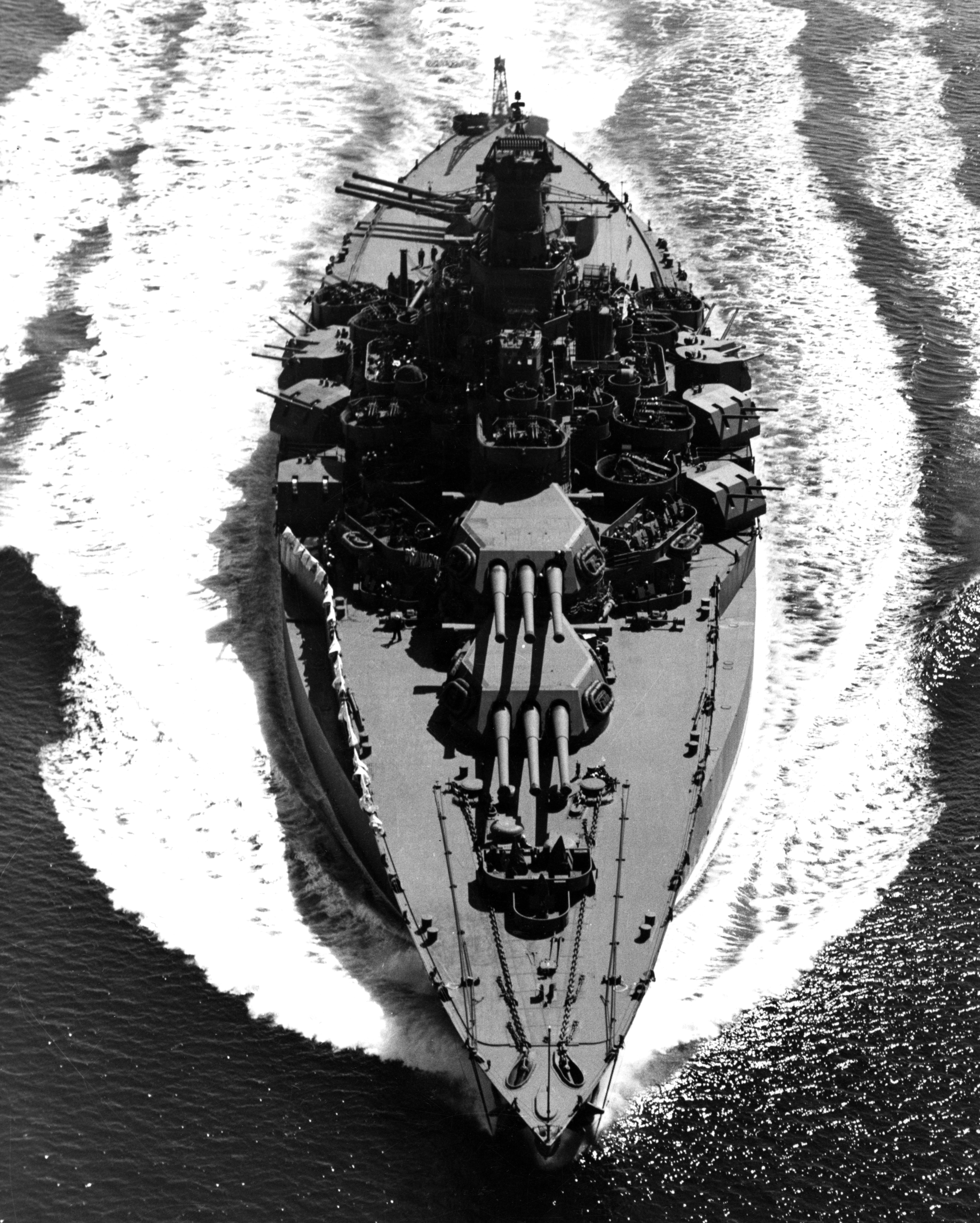
Battleship Tennessee after modernization

Seventh Fleet
Vice Admiral Thomas C. Kinkaid in amphibious command ship Wasatch

Task Force 77 (Central Philippines Attack Force)
Vice Admiral Kinkaid

Task Group 77.2
Rear Admiral Jesse B. Oldendorf in heavy cruiser Louisville

Task Unit 77.2.2 (Left Flank)
Rear Admiral Jesse B. Oldendorf

3 heavy cruisers

1 Northampton-class (9 × 8-in. main battery)

Louisville (Capt. S.H. Hurt)

1 Portland-class (9 × 8-in. main battery)

Portland (Capt. Thomas G. W. Settle)

1 New Orleans-class (9 × 8-in. main battery)

Minneapolis (Capt. H.B. Slocum)

2 light cruisers

Both Cleveland-class (12 × 6-in. main battery)

Denver (Capt. Albert M. Bledsoe)
Columbia (Capt. Maurice E. Curts)

Destroyer Squadron 56 (Capt. Roland N. Smoot)

9 Fletcher-class destroyers (5 × 5-in. main battery)

Newcomb, Richard P. Leary, Albert W. Grant (damaged by friendly and enemy gunfire), Robinson, Halford, Bryant, Heywood L. Edwards, Bennion, Leutze

Task Unit 77.2.1 (Battle Line)
Rear Admiral George L. Weyler in battleship Mississippi

6 old battleships

2 Colorado-class (8 × 16-in. main battery)

West Virginia (Capt. Herbert V. Wiley)
Maryland (Capt. Herbert J. Ray)

2 Tennessee-class (12 × 14-in. main battery)

Tennessee (Capt. J.B. Heffernan)
California (Capt. H.P. Burnett)

1 New Mexico-class (12 × 14-in. main battery)

Mississippi (Capt. H.J. Redfield)

1 Pennsylvania-class (12 × 14-in. main battery)

Pennsylvania (Capt. C.F. Martin)

6 destroyers

4 Fletcher-class (5 × 5-in. main battery)

Sigourney, Claxton, Aulick, Cony

2 Gleaves-class (4 × 5-in. main battery)

Thorn, Welles

Task Group 77.3 (Right Flank)
Rear Admiral Russell S. Berkey in light cruiser Phoenix

1 heavy cruiser

1 County-class (8 × 8-in. main battery)

Shropshire (Capt. C.A.G. Nichols, RN)

2 light cruisers

Both Brooklyn-class (15 × 6-in. main battery)

Phoenix (Capt. J.H. Duncan)
Boise (Capt. J.S. Roberts)

Destroyer Squadron 24 (Capt. Kenmore M. McManes)

5 Fletcher-class (5 × 5-in. main battery)

Hutchins, Bache, Beale, Daly, Killen

1 Tribal-class (8 × 4.7-in. main battery)

Arunta

Picket Patrol
Destroyer Squadron 54 (Capt. Jesse G. Coward)

Destroyer Division 107

2 Fletcher-class (5 × 5-in. main battery)

Remey, Monssen

Destroyer Division 108

3 Fletcher-class (5 × 5-in. main battery)

McDermut, McGowan, Melvin

Task Group 70.1 Motor Torpedo Boats

18 motor torpedo boats (MTB)

MTB Squadron 7: MTBs 127, 128, 129, 130, 131, 132, 134, 137
MTB Squadron 12: MTBs 146, 150, 151, 152, 190, 191, 192, 194, 195, 196

== 25 Oct – Battle off Samar ==
=== Japanese Forces ===
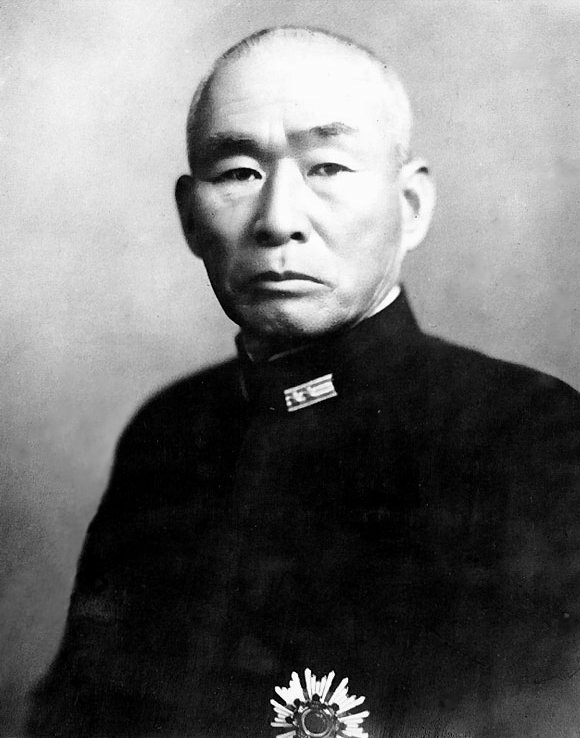
Vice Adm. Takeo Kurita

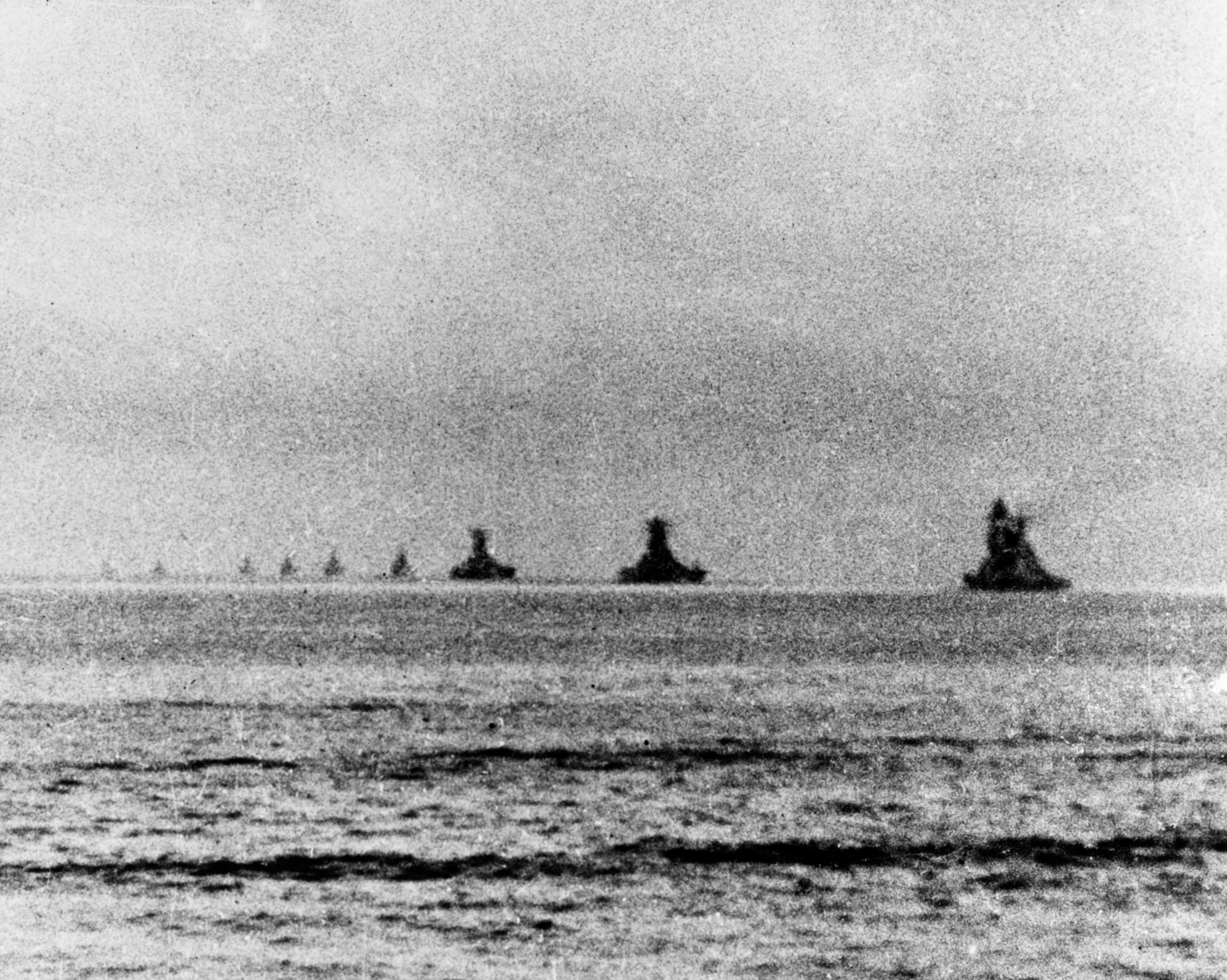
American submarine photo of Kurita's Center Force departing Brunei Bay

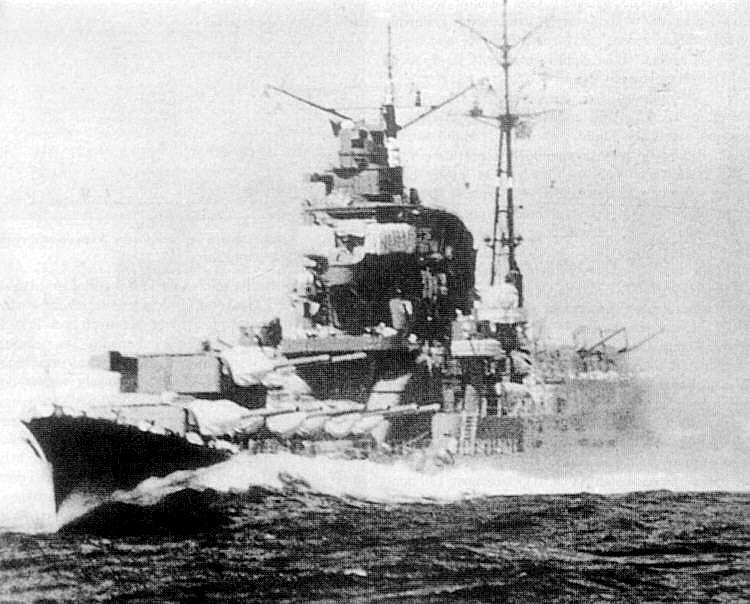
Heavy cruiser Chikuma

Center Force ('Force A') (sortied from Brunei Bay 22 Oct)

1st Section ('Force A')
Vice Admiral Takeo Kurita

Battleship Division 1 (Vice Adm. Matome Ugaki)

2 battleships

Yamato (9 × 18-in. main battery)
Nagato (8 × 16-in. main battery)

Cruiser Division 4 (Vice Adm. Kurita)

1 heavy cruiser

Chōkai (10 × 8-in. main battery) (scuttled 25 Oct)

Cruiser Division 5 (Vice Adm. Shintaro Hashimoto)

1 heavy cruiser

Haguro (10 × 8-in. main battery)

Destroyer Squadron 2 (Rear Adm. Mikio Hayakawa)

1 light cruiser

Noshiro (6 × 6.1-in. main battery) (sunk by air attack 26 Oct)

9 destroyers

8 Yugumo-class (6 × 5-in. main battery)

Akishimo, Asashimo, Fujinami (sunk by air attack 27 Oct), Hamanami, Hayashimo (sunk by air attack 26 Oct), Kishinami, Okinami, Naganami

1 Shimakaze (experimental destroyer type with 15 torpedo tubes)

Shimakaze (6 × 5-in. main battery)

2nd Section ('Force B')
Vice Admiral Yoshio Suzuki

Battleship Division 3 (Vice Adm. Suzuki)

2 battleships

Kongō (8 × 14-in. main battery)
Haruna (8 × 14-in. main battery)

Cruiser Division 7 (Vice Adm. Kazutaka Shiraishi)

4 heavy cruisers

Kumano (10 × 8-in. main battery)
Suzuya (10 × 8-in. main battery) (sunk by air attack 25 Oct)
Chikuma (8 × 8-in. main battery) (sunk/scuttled 25 Oct)
Tone (8 × 8-in. main battery)

Destroyer Squadron 10 (Rear Adm. Susumu Kimura)

1 light cruiser

Yahagi (6 × 6.1-in. main battery)

6 destroyers

5 Kagero-class (6 × 5-in. main battery)

Hamakaze, Isokaze, Nowaki (sunk by air attack 26 Oct), Urakaze, Yukikaze

1 Yugumo-class (6 × 5-in. main battery)

Kiyoshimo

Note: Battleship Musashi and heavy cruisers Atago (Kurita's original flagship), Takao, Myōkō, and Maya had been assigned to Center Force, but had been sunk or damaged by air and submarine attacks prior to the Battle off Samar.

=== American Forces ===
Escort Carrier and Taffy 3 Commanders

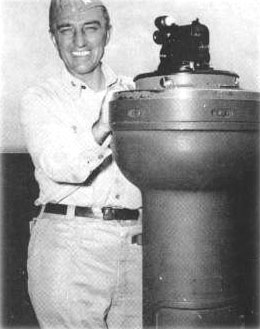
Rear Adm. Thomas L. Sprague

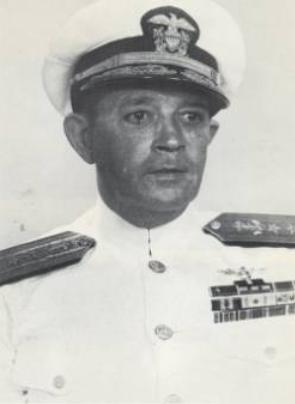
Rear Adm. Clifton A.F. Sprague

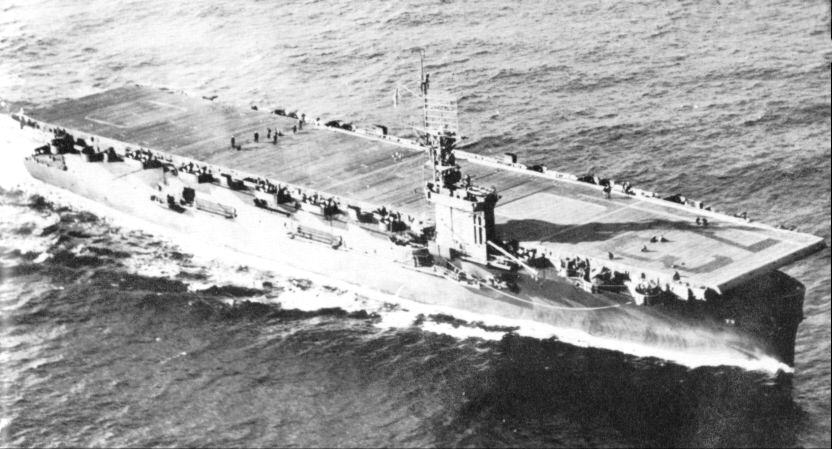
Escort carrier Gambier Bay

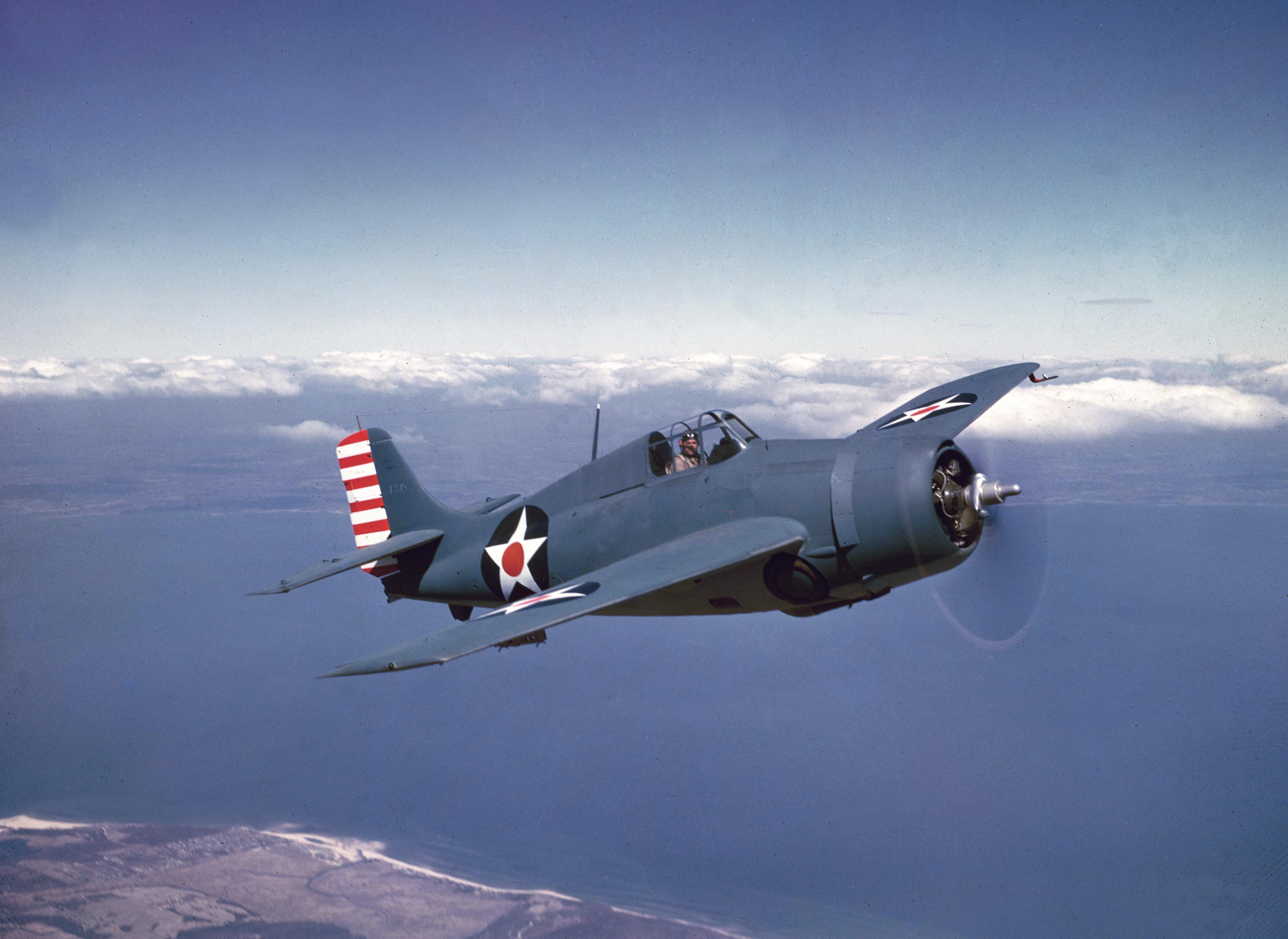
Grumman F4F Wildcat fighter

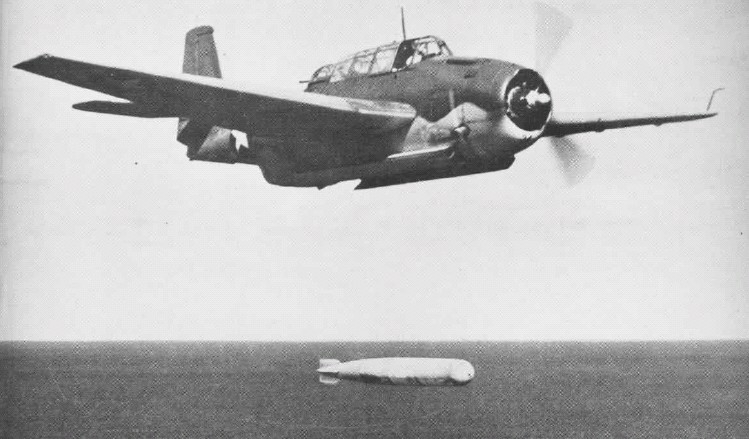
Grumman TBF Avenger torpedo bomber

Seventh Fleet
Vice Admiral Thomas C. Kinkaid in amphibious command ship Wasatch

Task Force 77 (Central Philippines Attack Force)
Vice Admiral Kinkaid

Task Group 77.4 (Escort Carrier Group)
Rear Admiral Thomas L. Sprague

Task Unit 77.4.1 ("Taffy 1") (Rear Admiral Thomas L. Sprague)

6 escort carriers

Sangamon (Captain M.E. Browder) Air Group 37 (Lt. Commander S.E. Hindman)
Suwannee (Captain W.D. Johnson) Air Group 60 (Lt. Commander H.O. Feilbach USNR)
Chenango (Captain George Van Deurs) Air Group 35 (Lt. Commander F.T. Moore)
Santee (Captain R.E. Blick) Air Group 26 (Lt. Commander H.N Funk)
Saginaw Bay (Captain F.C. Sutton) Composite Squadron 78(Lt. Commander J.L. Hyde)
Petrof Bay (Captain J.L. Kane ) Composite Squadron 76(Commander J.W. McCauley)

3 Fletcher-class (5 × 5-in. main battery)

McCord, Hazelwood, Trathen

4 John C. Butler-class destroyer escorts (2 × 5-in. main battery)

Richard S. Bull, Eversole, Richard M. Rowell, Coolbaugh

Task Unit 77.4.3 ("Taffy 3")
Rear Admiral Clifton A.F. Sprague

6 escort carriers

Fanshaw Bay (Capt. D.P. Johnson)

Composite Squadron 68 (Lt. Cmdr. R.S. Rogers)

16 FM-2 Wildcat fighters
12 TBM Avenger torpedo bombers

St. Lo (Capt. Francis Joseph McKenna) (sunk by kamikaze 1125 hrs.)

Composite Squadron 65 (Lt. Cmdr. Ralph Meldrim Jones, KIA)

17 FM-2 Wildcat fighters
12 TBM Avenger torpedo bombers

White Plains (Capt. D.J. Sullivan)

Composite Squadron 4 (Lt. E.R. Fickenscher)

16 FM-2 Wildcat fighters
12 TBM Avenger torpedo bombers

Kalinin Bay (Capt. T.B. Williamson) (damaged)

Composite Squadron 3 (Lt. W.H. Keighley)

16 FM-2 Wildcat fighters
1 TBF, 11 TBM Avenger torpedo bombers

Carrier Division 26 (Rear Adm. Ralph A. Ofstie)

Kitkun Bay (Capt. J.P. Whitney)

Composite Squadron 5 (Cmdr. R.L. Fowler)

14 FM-2 Wildcat fighters
12 TBM Avenger torpedo bombers

Gambier Bay (Capt. Walter Victor Rudolph Vieweg) (sunk by gunfire 0907 hrs.)

Composite Squadron 10 (Lt. Cmdr. Edward John Huxtable, Jr.)

18 FM-2 Wildcat fighters
12 TBM Avenger torpedo bombers

Screen

3 Fletcher-class destroyers (5 × 5-in. main battery)

Hoel (sunk by gunfire 0855 hrs.), Heermann, Johnston (sunk by gunfire 1010 hrs.)

4 John C. Butler-class destroyer escorts (2 × 5-in. main battery)

Dennis, John C. Butler, Raymond, Samuel B. Roberts (sunk by gunfire 1005 hrs.)

Taffy 2 Commander

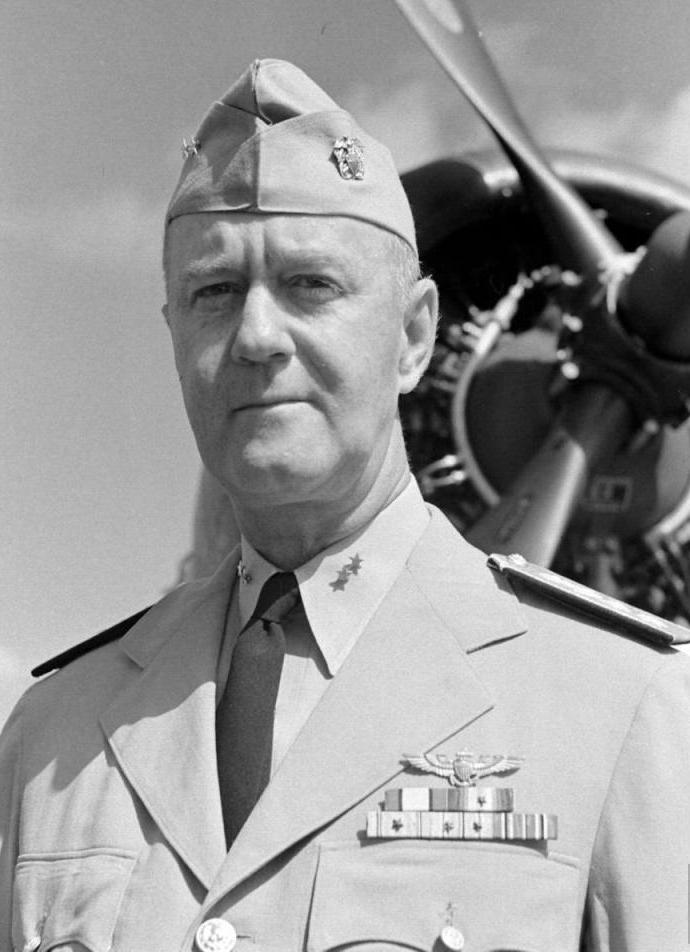
Rear Adm. Felix B. Stump

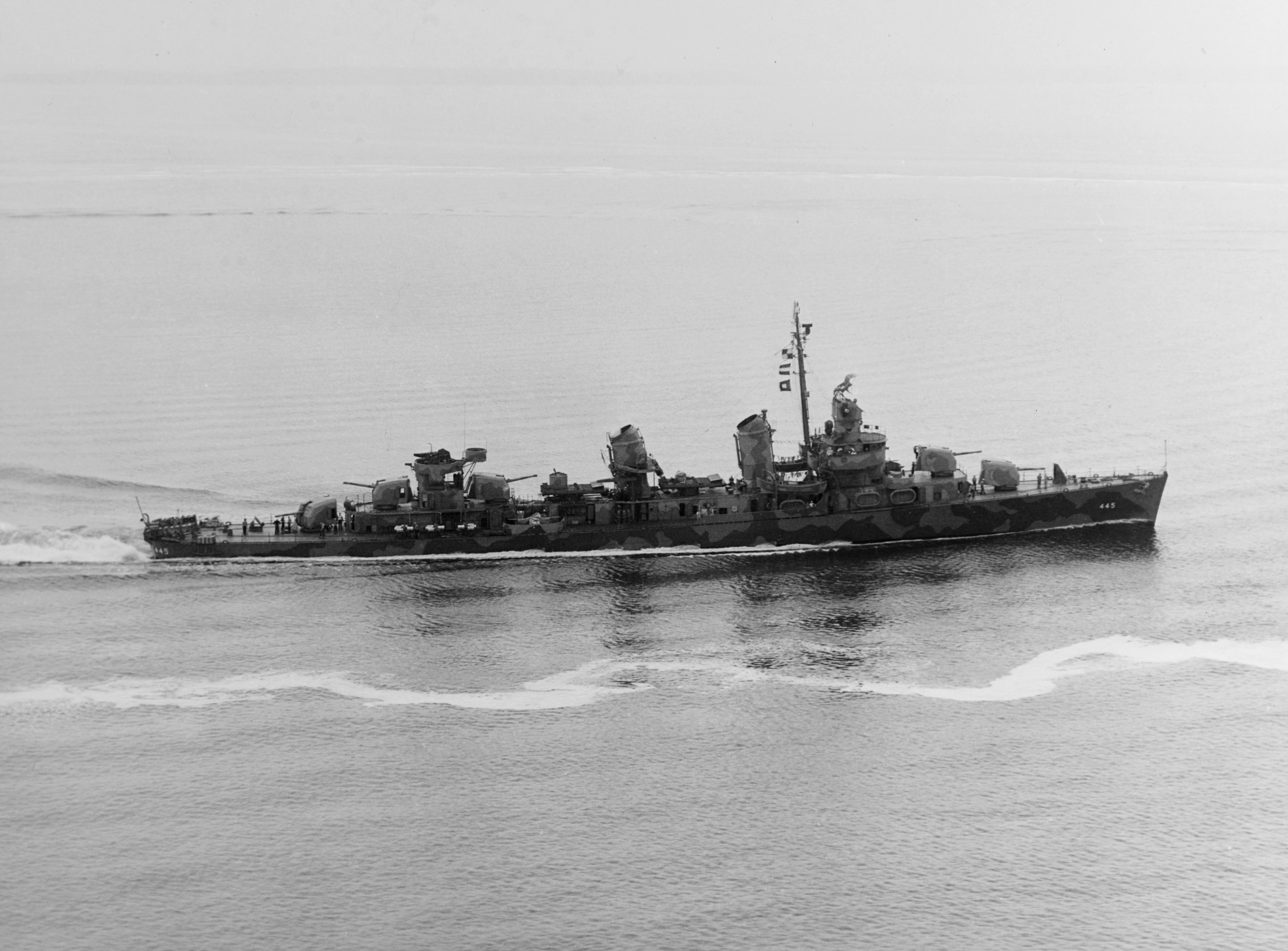
Fletcher-class destroyer

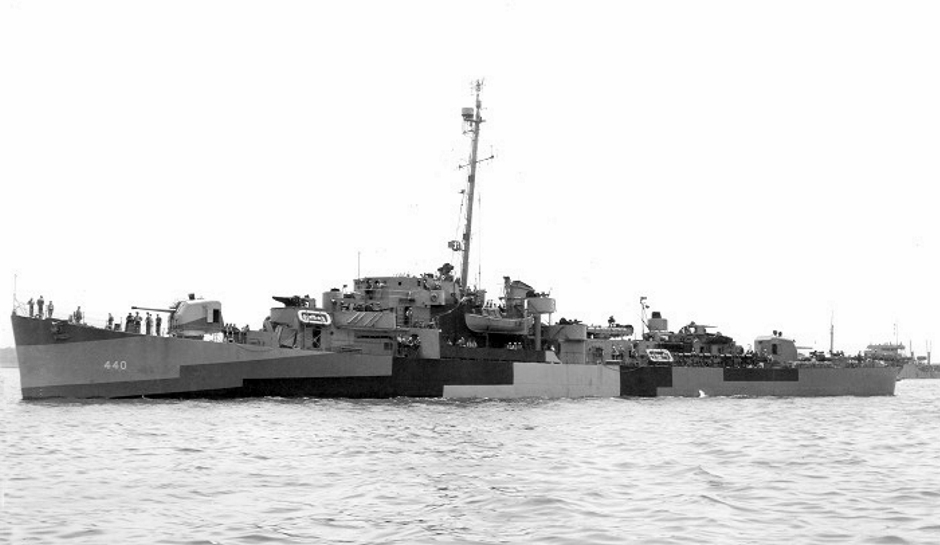
John C. Butler-class destroyer escort

Task Unit 77.4.2 ("Taffy 2")
Rear Admiral Felix B. Stump

6 escort carriers

Natoma Bay (Capt. A.K. Morehouse)

Composite Squadron 81 (Lt. Cmdr. R.C. Barnes)

16 FM-2 Wildcat fighters
12 TBM Avenger torpedo bombers

Manila Bay (Capt. Fitzhugh Lee III)

Composite Squadron 80 (Lt. Cmdr. H.K. Stubbs)

16 FM-2 Wildcat fighters
12 TBM Avenger torpedo bombers

Carrier Division 27 (Rear Adm. William D. Sample)

Marcus Island (Capt. C.F. Greber)

Composite Squadron 21 (Lt. Cmdr T.O. Murray)

12 FM-2 Wildcat fighters
11 TBM Avenger torpedo bombers

Kadashan Bay (Capt. R.N. Hunter)

Composite Squadron 20 (Lt. Cmdr. J.R. Dale)

15 FM-2 Wildcat fighters
11 TBM Avenger torpedo bombers

Savo Island (Capt. C.E. Ekstrom)

Composite Squadron 27 (Lt. Cmdr. P.W. Jackson)

16 FM-2 Wildcat fighters
12 TBM Avenger torpedo bombers

Ommaney Bay (Capt. H.L. Young)

Composite Squadron 75 (Lt. Cmdr. A.W. Smith)

16 FM-2 Wildcat fighters
11 TBM Avenger torpedo bombers

Screen

3 Fletcher-class destroyers (5 × 5-in. main battery)

Haggard, Franks, Hailey

5 John C. Butler-class destroyer escorts (2 × 5-in. main battery)

Richard W. Suesens, Abercrombie, Oberrender, LeRay Wilson, Walter C. Wann

== 25 - 26 Oct – Battle off Cape Engaño ==
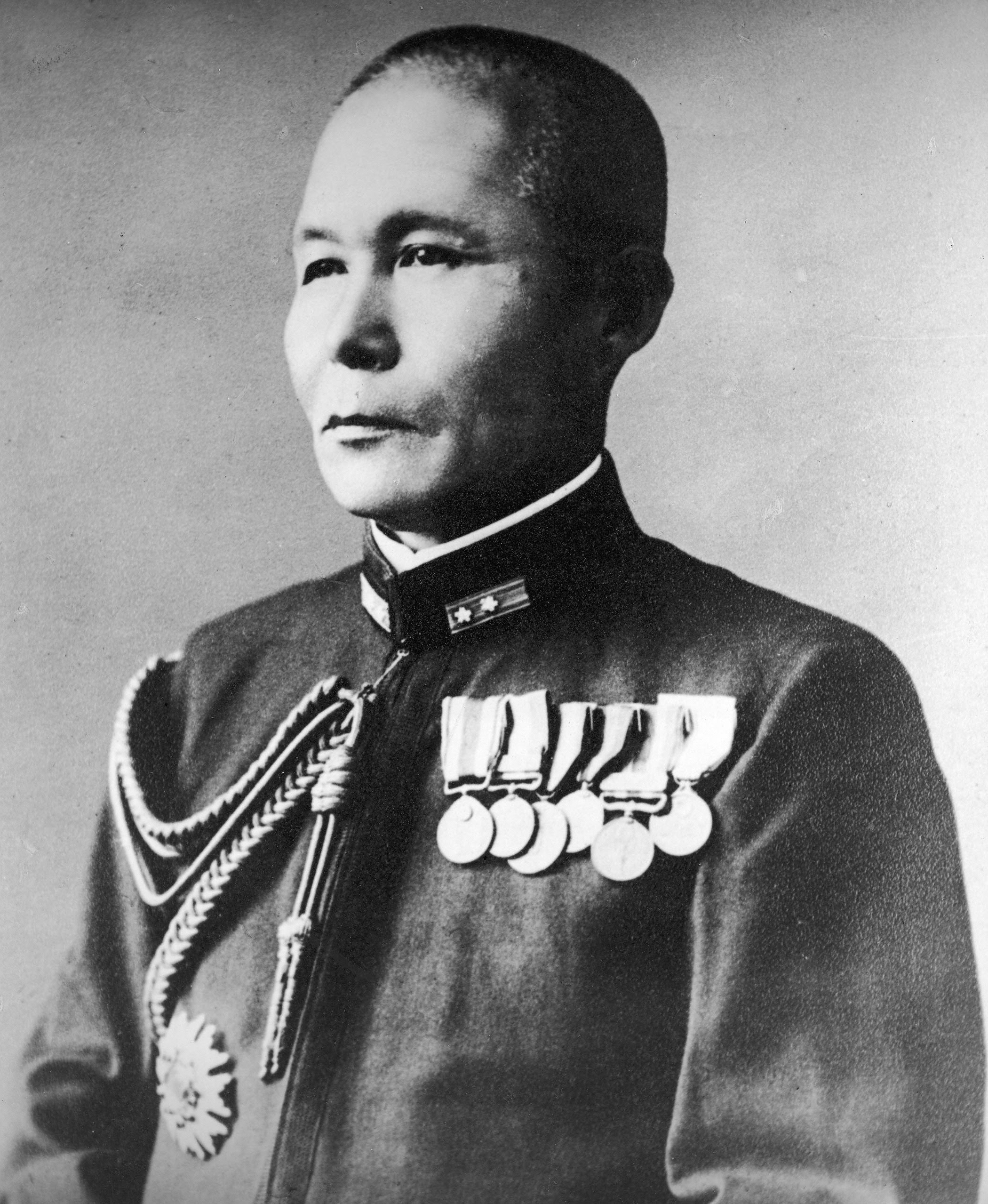
Vice Adm. Jisaburo Ozawa

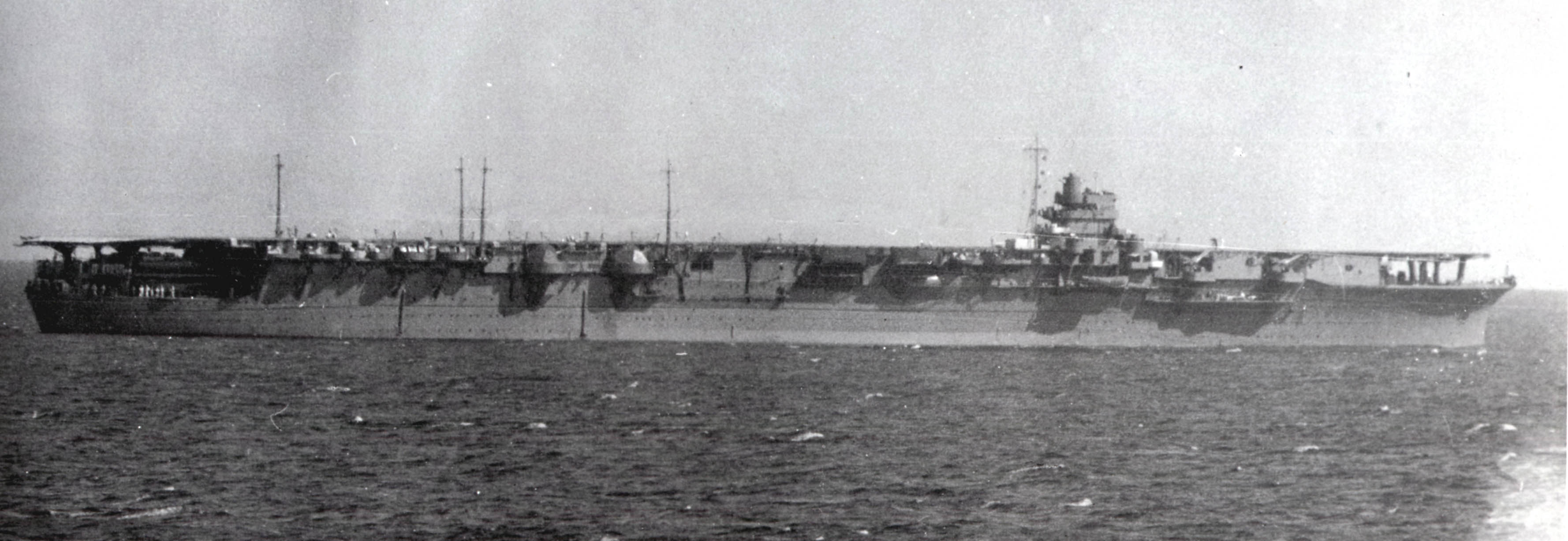
Fleet carrier Zuikaku

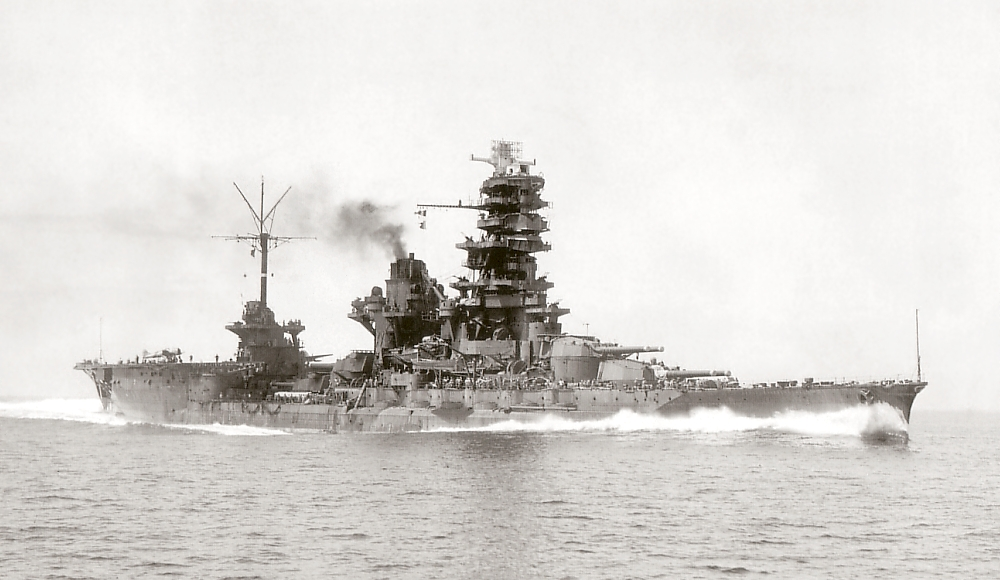
Battleship Ise after conversion to hybrid aircraft carrier

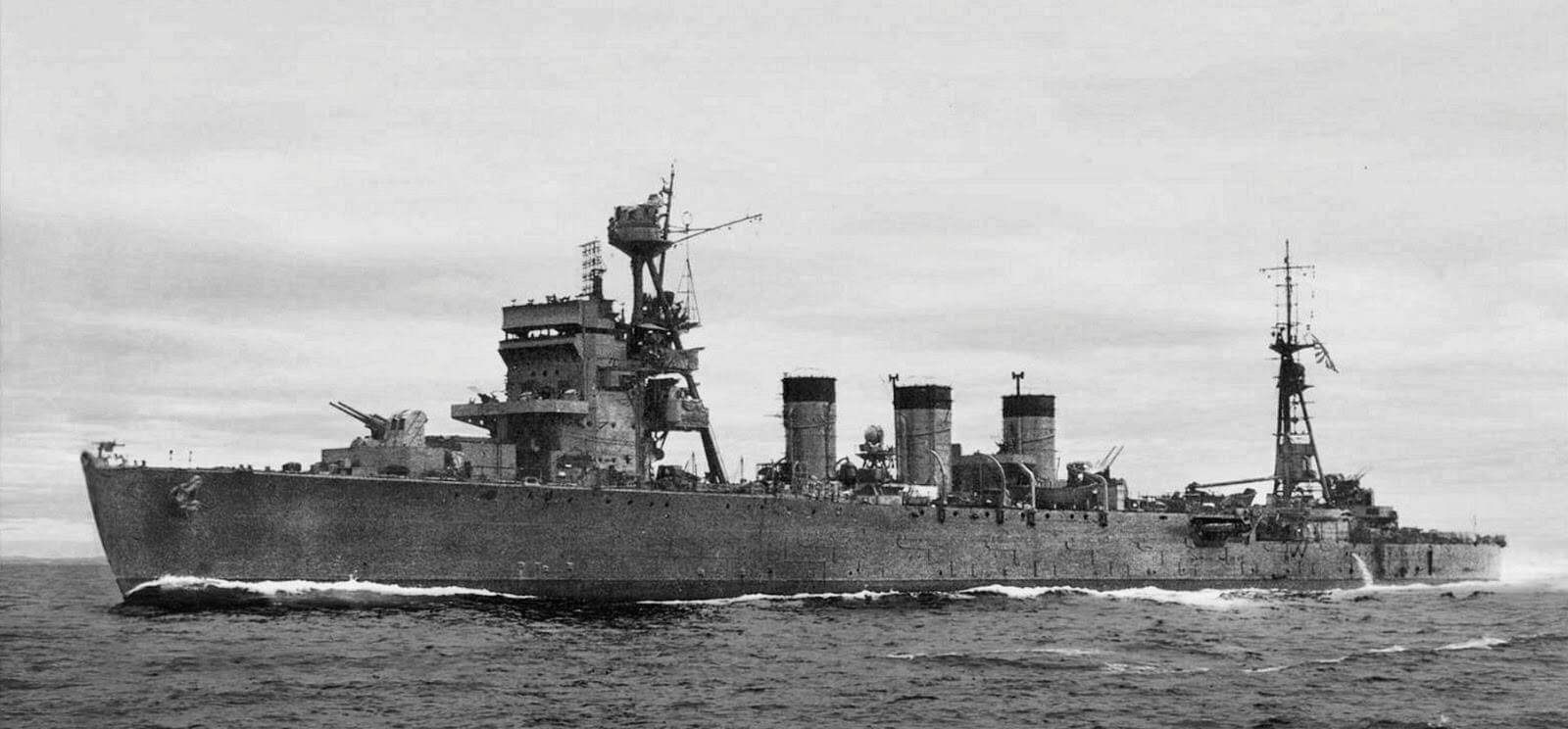
Light cruiser Isuzu

=== Japanese Forces ===
Northern Force ('Main Body') (sortied from Japanese Home Islands 20 Oct)
Vice Admiral Jisaburo Ozawa

Carrier Division 3 (Vice Adm. Jisaburo Ozawa)

1 fleet carrier

Zuikaku (sunk by air attack 25 Oct)

3 light carriers

Zuihō (sunk by air attack 26 Oct)
Chitose (sunk by air attack, gunfire and torpedoes 26 Oct)
Chiyoda (sunk by air attack, gunfire and torpedoes 26 Oct)

Combined air group

39 Mitsubishi A6M2 'Zeke' fighters
42 Yokosuka D4Y1 'Judy' dive bombers
33 Nakajima B6N 'Jill' torpedo bombers
4 Nakajima B5N2 'Kate' torpedo bombers

Carrier Division 4 (Rear Adm. Chiaki Matsuda)

2 hybrid battleship carriers

Ise (8 × 14-in. main battery)
Hyūga (8 × 14-in. main battery)

Combined air group for this operation: none

Screen (Rear Adm. Heitaro Edo)

1 light cruiser

Isuzu (7 × 5.5-in. main battery)

8 destroyers

4 Akizuki-class (8 × 3.9-in. main battery)

Akizuki (sunk by air attack 25 Oct), Hatsuzuki (sunk by gunfire 25 Oct), Shimotsuki, Wakatsuki

4 Matsu-class (3 × 5-in. main battery)

Kiri, Kuwa, Maki, Sugi

2 light cruisers

Tama (7 × 5.5-in. main battery) (sunk by submarine 25 Oct)
Ōyodo (6 × 6.1-in. main battery)

Supply Unit

2 oilers: Jinei Maru (sunk), Takane Maru
1 destroyer: Akikaze (4 × 4.7-in. main battery)
6 escort vessels: CD-22, CD-29, CD-31, CD-33, CD-43, CD-132

=== American Forces ===
Task Force 38 and Task Group Commanders

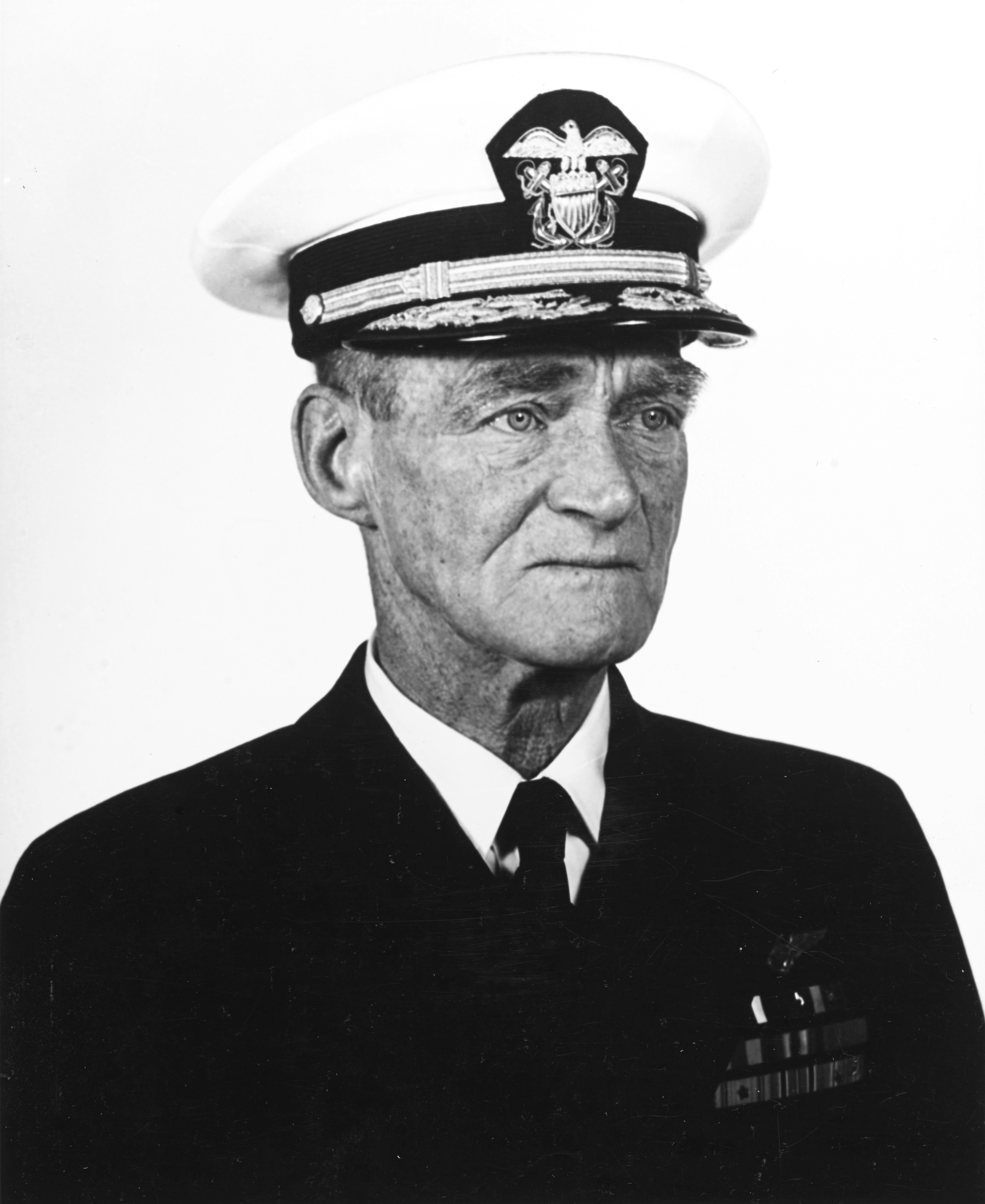
Vice Adm. Marc A. Mitscher

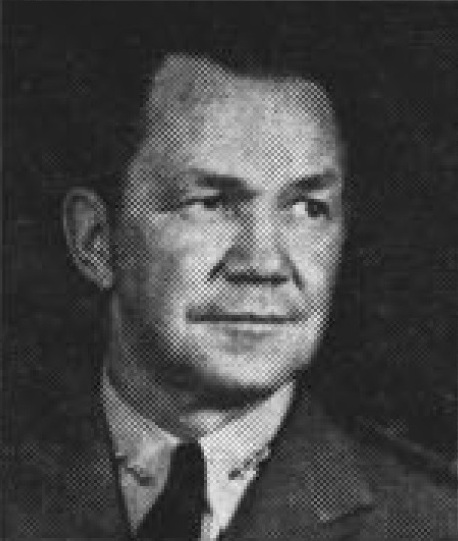
Rear Adm. Gerald F. Bogan

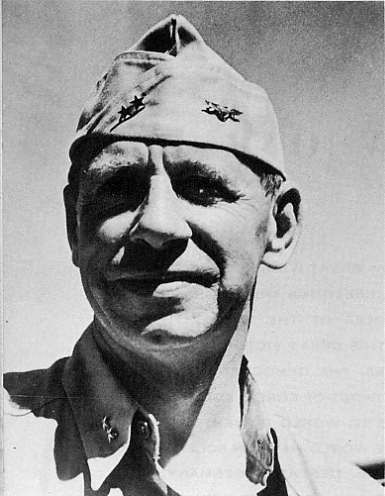
Rear Adm. Frederick C. Sherman

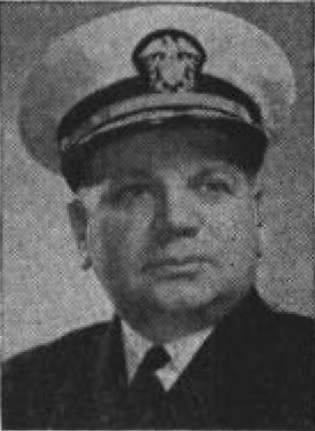
Rear Adm. Ralph E. Davison

(according to)

Third Fleet
Admiral William F. Halsey in battleship New Jersey

Task Force 38 (Fast Carrier Force)
Vice Admiral Marc A. Mitscher in fleet carrier Lexington

Task Group 38.2 (Task Group Two)
Rear Adm. Gerald F. Bogan

1 fleet carrier

Intrepid

2 light carriers

Cabot
Independence

2 fast battleships

Both Iowa-class (9 × 16-in./50-cal. main battery)

Iowa
New Jersey

3 light cruisers

Biloxi
Vincennes
Miami

16 destroyers

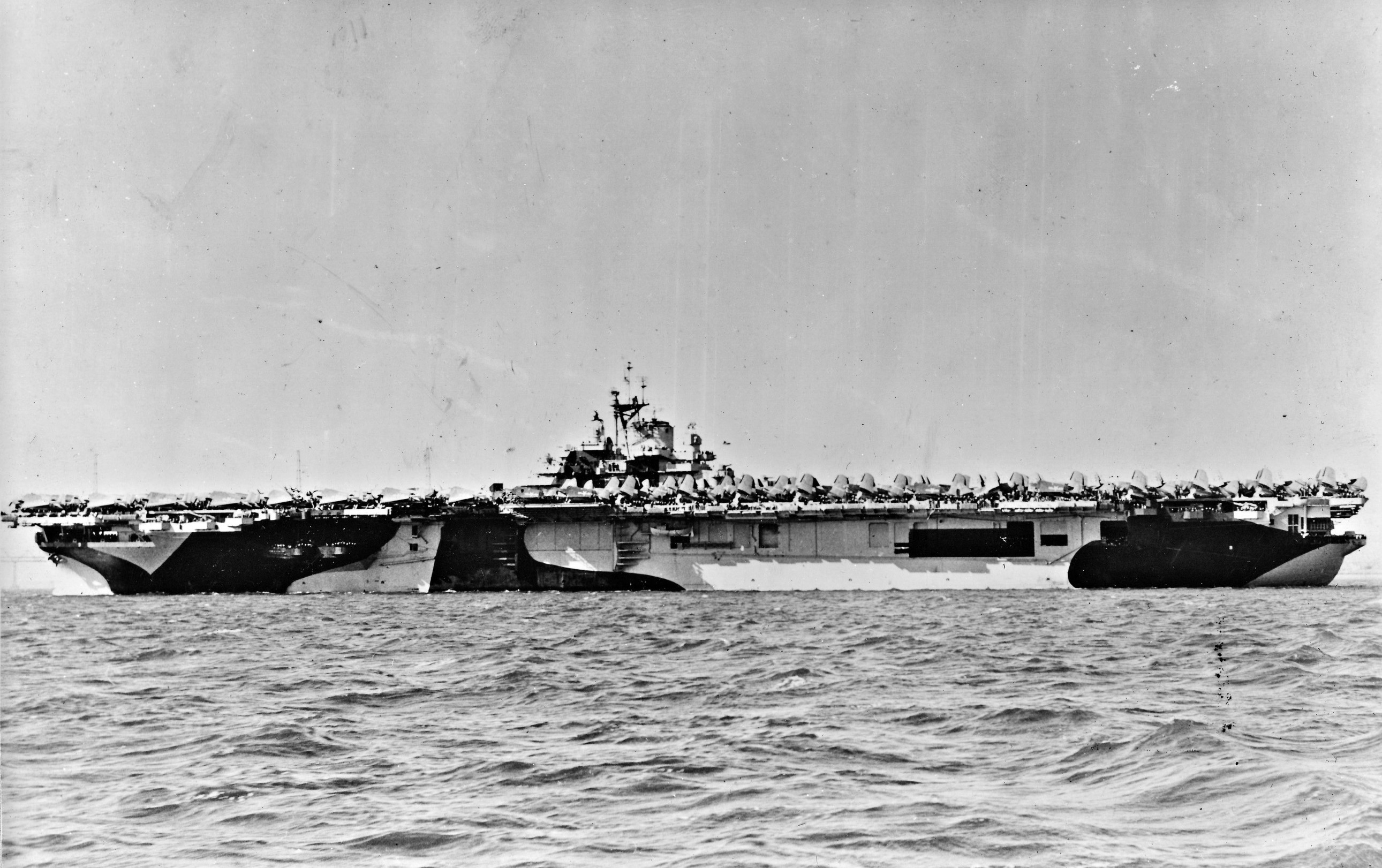
Portside view of the U.S. aircraft carrier USS Essex (CV-9), 1944.

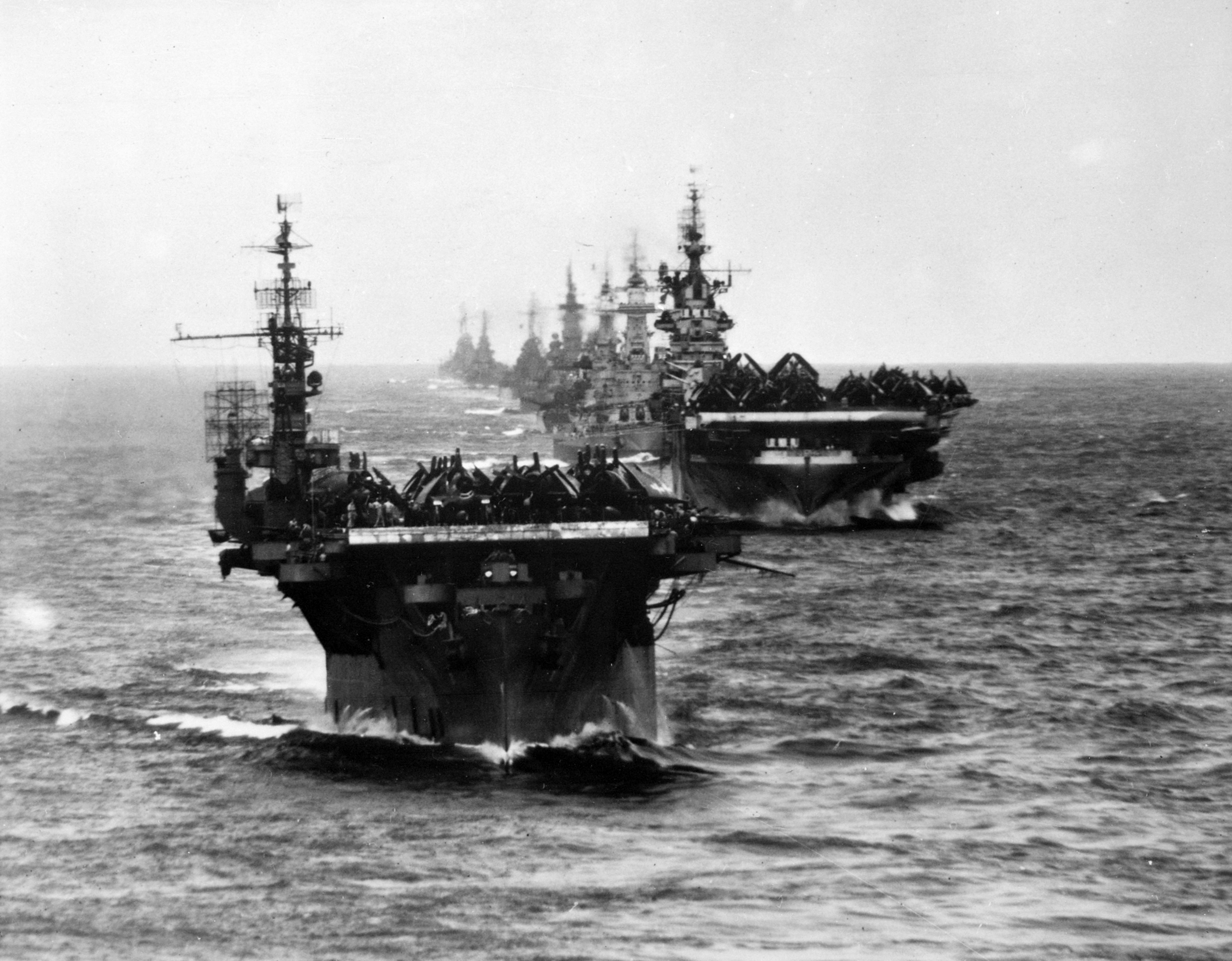
Task Group 38.3 enters Ulithi led by USS Langley (CVL-27), 1944.

Task Group 38.3 (Task Group Three)
Rear Adm. Frederick C. Sherman

2 fleet carriers

Essex
Lexington

1 light carrier

Langley

2 fast battleships

Both South Dakota-class (9 × 16-in./45-cal. main battery)

South Dakota
Massachusetts

3 light cruisers

Santa Fe
Mobile
Reno

10 destroyers

Task Group 38.4 (Task Group Four)
Rear Adm. Ralph E. Davison

2 fleet carriers

Franklin
Enterprise

2 light carriers

San Jacinto
Belleau Wood

2 fast battleships

1 North Carolina-class (9 × 16-in./45-cal. main battery)

Washington

1 South Dakota-class (9 × 16-in./45-cal. main battery)

Alabama

2 heavy cruisers

New Orleans
Wichita

15 destroyers

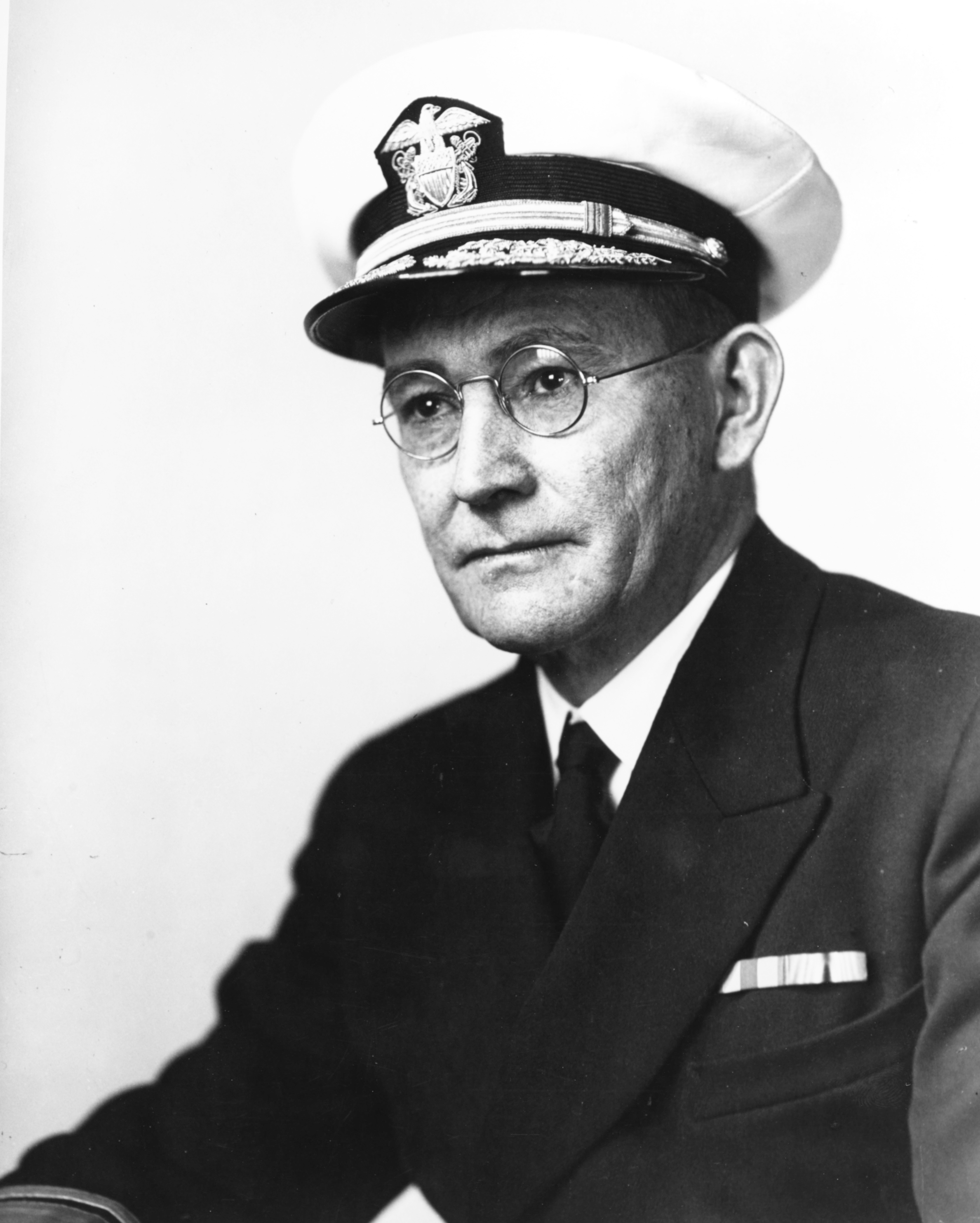
Vice Adm. Willis A. Lee

Task Force 34 (formed at 02:40 on 25 October, dissolved at 10:55 on 25 October)
Vice Adm. Willis A. Lee

6 fast battleships
2 heavy cruisers

New Orleans
Wichita

5 light cruisers

Santa Fe
Mobile
Biloxi
Vincennes
Miami

18 destroyers
