= Matsu =

Matsu may refer to:

- Mazu, or Matsu, a sea goddess in Chinese folk religion
- Matsu-class destroyer, a series of Japanese warships
- Matsu Islands (Lienchiang County), Fujian, Republic of China (Taiwan)
- Matsu Beigan Airport
- Matsushima (Matsu Islands), in Miyagi Prefecture, Japan
- Japanese ship Matsu, several ships
- Matsu (Sekirei), a character in the Sekirei manga and anime
- Japanese pine (まつ, 松), matsu in Japanese

== See also ==
- Matanuska-Susitna Valley (Mat-Su Valley, an area in South Central Alaska)
- Matanuska-Susitna Borough (Mat-Su Borough), a borough of Alaska
- Mazu (disambiguation), Chinese origin of matsu
- Open Commons Consortium (Project Matsu), imaging process project for human assisted disaster relief named after the goddess
