= Mazu (disambiguation) =

Mazu is a goddess worshipped in China, Taiwan, and Southeast Asia.

Mazu may also refer to:

- Matsu Islands, also spelled Mazu
- Mazu Daoyi (709–788), master of Chan Buddhism
- Mazu (TV series), 2012 Chinese mythology fantasy television series starring Liu Tao, Stephen Wong Ka-lok, and Yan Kuan

== Iran ==
- Mazu, Fars, a village in Fars Province, Iran
- Istgah-e Mazu, a village in Khuzestan Province, Iran
- Mazu, Iran, a village in Khuzestan Province, Iran
- Mazu Rural District, an administrative subdivision of Khuzestan Province, Iran

== See also ==
- Matsu (disambiguation)
