= Online Compliance Consortium =

- Industry: Regulatory compliance
- Founded: 2004
- Headquarters: London, United Kingdom
- Website: Official website

The Online Compliance Consortium (OCC) is a group of top global law firms who work together to establish global best practice for compliance.

== History ==
The OCC collaboratively develops compliance and risk management training, tools and technology to the specifications of its member companies.

The group was founded in 2004, facilitated by e-learning developer Vinciworks, under the principle that there is no competitive advantage in compliance. Due to potential criminal liability, representatives of 14 firms, led by Hogan Lovells COO Nick Cray, met to define global compliance standards. Their initial task was to build money laundering training modules for law firms.

Today the OCC represents over 150 leading law firms, including 60 of the top 100 UK firms, eight of the top 10 US firms and the leading firms in both Hong Kong and Sweden. By collaborating with other firms, OCC members benefit from the expertise of the group, the assurance of accuracy and tremendous cost savings. The current list of OCC law firms includes: Allen & Overy, Bevan Brittan, Blake Morgan, Cleary Gottlieb Steen & Hamilton, CMS, Debevoise and Plimpton, DLA Piper, DWF, Herbert Smith Freehills, Hogan Lovells, Holman Fenwick & Willan, Macfarlanes, Mills & Reeve, Shearman & Sterling, and Weil Gotshal & Manges.
