= Client-side persistent data =

Client-side persistent data or CSPD is a term used in computing for storing data required by web applications to complete internet tasks on the client-side as needed rather than exclusively on the server. As a framework it is one solution to the needs of Occasionally connected computing or OCC.

A major challenge for HTTP as a stateless protocol has been asynchronous tasks. The AJAX pattern using XMLHttpRequest was first introduced by Microsoft in the context of the Outlook e-mail product.

The first CSPD were the 'cookies' introduced by the Netscape Navigator. ActiveX components which have entries in the Windows registry can also be viewed as a form of client-side persistence.

== See also ==
- Occasionally connected computing
- Curl (programming_language)
- AJAX
- HTTP
- Web storage
