= Optical Cable Corporation =

American company

- Type: Public
- Traded as: Nasdaq: OCC
- Industry: Fiber Optics
- Founded: 1983; 43 years ago, in Roanoke, Virginia
- Headquarters: Roanoke, Virginia, United States
- Key people: Neil Wilkin (president and CEO)
- Products: Manufacturer of Fiber Optical Cable
- Revenue: $44.63 million USD (2005)
- Number of employees: 300
- Website: occfiber.com

Optical Cable Corporation, headquartered in Roanoke, Virginia, manufactures fiber optical cable. The company's cable is largely used for telecommunications and is sold both in the US and seventy other countries worldwide. OCC also manufactures military land tactical fiber optic cable for the U.S. military.

== History ==
Founded in 1983 by Bob Thompson and Robert Kopstein, OCC designs and manufactures telecommunications cable products. OCC currently employs a worldwide network of distributors for its range of products.

Since 1996, OCC has been publicly traded (NASDAQ GM: OCC), with customers in more than 70 countries.

== Acquisitions ==
In recent years, OCC has acquired two companies. Acquired on June 2, 2008, the business formerly known as SMP Data Communications develops products for connectivity and networking. On November 1, 2009, OCC acquired Applied Optical Systems, a facility that manufactures specialty fiber optic connectors and connectivity solutions for military and harsh environment applications.

In addition, the company offers a broad range of Mine Safety and Health Administration–approved cable.
