= CSPD (molecule) =

Names
- IUPAC name 3-(1-Chloro-3'-methoxyspiro[adamantane-4,4'-dioxetane]-3'-yl)phenyl] dihydrogen phosphate

Identifiers
CAS Number	142456-88-0; 142849-53-4 (disodium salt)
3D model (JSmol)	Interactive image
ChemSpider	58191
PubChem CID	64633
CompTox Dashboard (EPA)	DTXSID20931463
- InChI: InChI=1S/C18H22ClO7P/c1-23-18(12-3-2-4-15(7-12)24-27(20,21)22)17(25-26-18)13-5-11-6-14(17)10-16(19,8-11)9-13/h2-4,7,11,13-14H,5-6,8-10H2,1H3,(H2,20,21,22) Key: QWXOJIDBSHLIFI-UHFFFAOYSA-N
- SMILES: COC1(C2(C3CC4CC2CC(C4)(C3)Cl)OO1)c5cccc(c5)OP(=O)(O)O

Properties
Chemical formula	C_{18}H_{22}ClO_{7}P
Molar mass	416.79 g·mol^{−1}
- Except where otherwise noted, data are given for materials in their standard state (at 25 °C [77 °F], 100 kPa). verify (what is ?) Infobox references

CSPD ([3-(1-chloro-3'-methoxyspiro[adamantane-4,4'-dioxetane]-3'-yl)phenyl] dihydrogen phosphate) is a chemical substance with formula C_{18}H_{22}ClO_{7}P. It is a component of enhanced chemiluminescence enzyme-linked immunosorbent assay (ELISA) kits, used for the detection of minute amounts of various substances such as proteins.

== Properties ==
The molecule CSPD has the following functional groups in the structure: phosphate group, phenyl group, spiro group, methyl ether group, and chlorine group. The ones worth noting are the ones above. None of these groups carry a charge. If there was a charge this would have had a change in the compound's pH, 3D structure, mass and bond angles.

The toxin CSPD effect persister cell formation using MqsR (MqsR, a crucial regulator for quorum sensing and biofilm formation, is a GCU-specific mRNA interferase in Escherichia coli) and persister cells are cells that avoid stress and are characterized by reduced metabolism and other factors.
