= Russell S. Berkey =

American admiral (1893–1985)

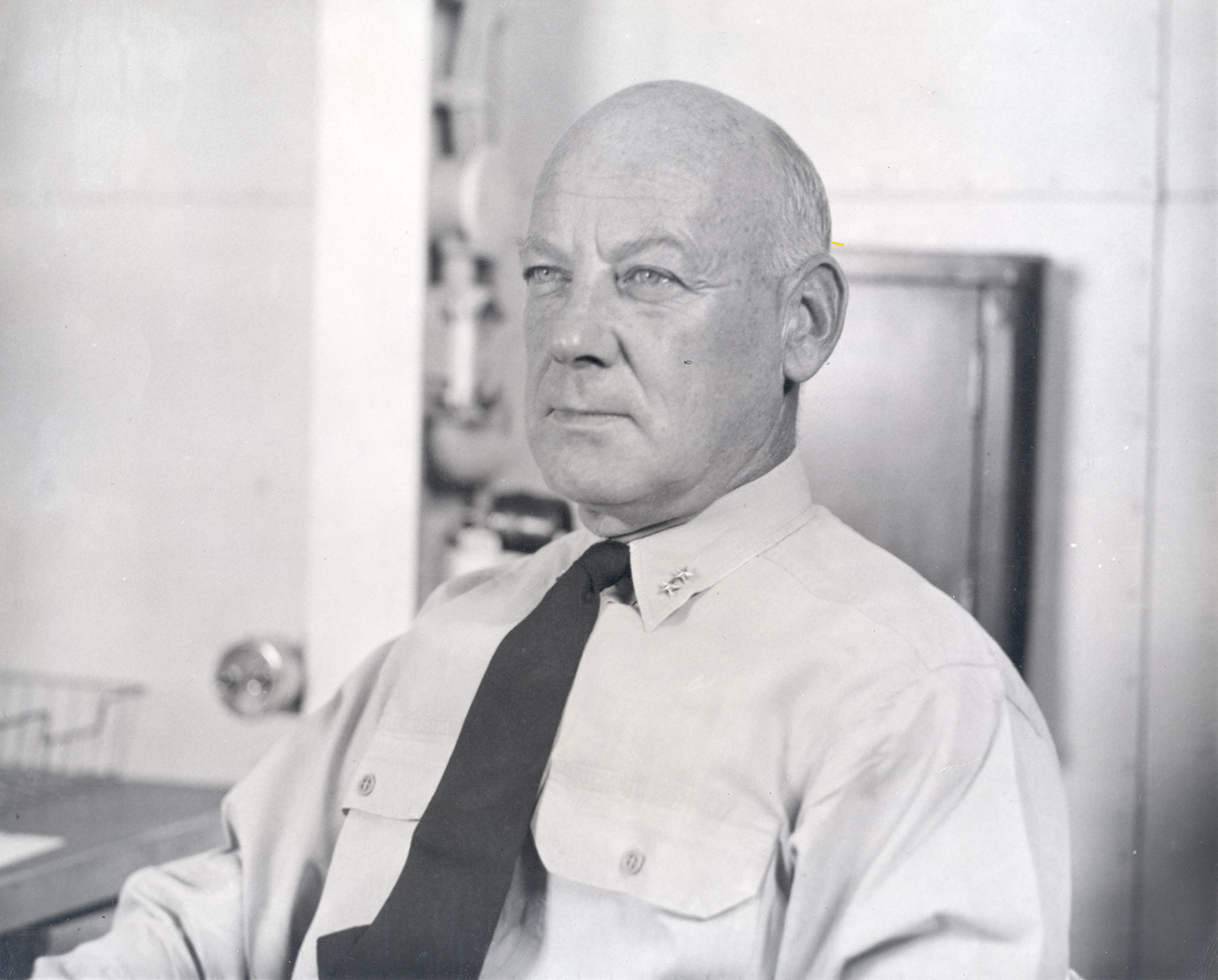
- Rear Adm. Russell Berkey, July 12, 1945
- Born: August 4, 1893; Goshen, Indiana, U.S.
- Died: 17 June 1985 (aged 91)
- Military career
- Allegiance: United States of America
- Branch: United States Navy
- Service years: 1916–1950
- Rank: Admiral
- Commands: USS Santa Fe; Seventh Fleet; U.S. Naval Forces Far East
- Conflicts: World War I World War II
- Awards: Navy Cross; Navy Distinguished Service Medal

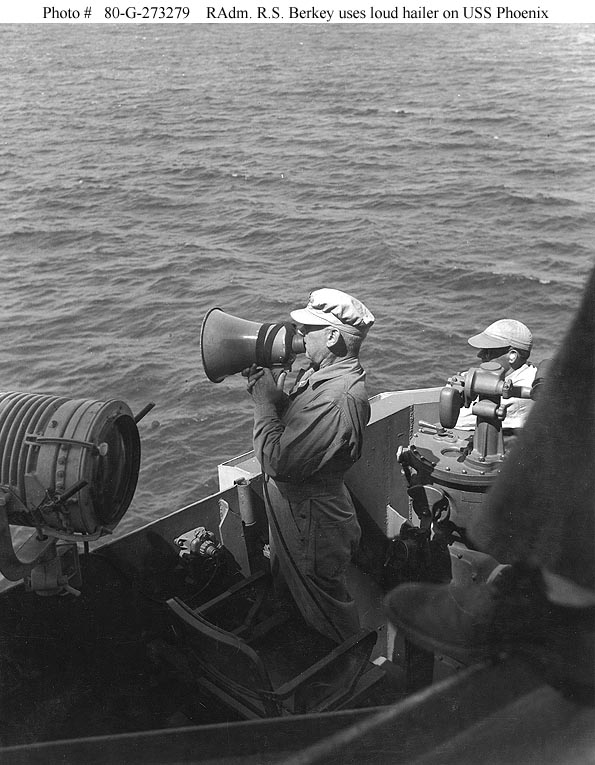
Rear Admiral R. S. Berkey on the cruiser USS Phoenix

Russell Stanley Berkey (August 4, 1893 – June 17, 1985) was an admiral in the United States Navy during World War II.

Admiral Berkey was a native of Indiana and graduated from the United States Naval Academy in 1916. Following graduation he served on board the battleship USS New York. Between 1918 and 1942 he served in variety of assignments, including as flag secretary to commander, Destroyer Force, Atlantic Fleet and as flag lieutenant to commander, Battleship Division Four. He completed two deployments as commanding officer aboard USS Panay, which patrolled the Yangtze River in China.

Following the start of World War II he was assigned to command the cruiser USS Santa Fe and became her first captain in 1942. Later as a rear admiral he commanded a cruiser division and task force during the Battle of Leyte Gulf and Corregidor invasion operations. His flagship at this time was the cruiser USS Phoenix. He also commanded the right flank cruisers and destroyers during the Battle of Surigao Strait and was subsequently awarded the Navy Cross for his combat leadership. Following the war he served as commander of the Seventh Fleet from August 28, 1949, until April 5, 1950, and then Commander U.S. Naval Forces, Far East.

He retired in September 1950, and died in 1985.
