= Japanese ship Matsu =

Several ships have been named Matsu (松 / まつ, "pine tree"):

- Japanese destroyer Matsu (1915), a Kaba-class destroyer of the Imperial Japanese Navy during World War I
- Japanese destroyer Matsu (1944), the lead ship of her class during World War II
  - Matsu-class destroyer, a class of destroyer built for the Imperial Japanese Navy
- Japanese submarine I-29, a submarine of the Imperial Japanese Navy, code-named Matsu
- JDS Matsu (PF-286), a Kusu-class patrol frigate of the Japan Maritime Self-Defense Force, formerly USS Charlottesville (PF-25)

== See also ==
- Matsu (disambiguation)
