= Open Commons Consortium =

The Open Commons Consortium (aka OCC - formerly the Open Cloud Consortium) is a 501(c)(3) non-profit venture which provides cloud computing and data commons resources to support "scientific, environmental, medical and health care research." OCC manages and operates resources including the Open Science Data Cloud (aka OSDC), which is a multi-petabyte scientific data sharing resource. The consortium is based in Chicago, Illinois, and is managed by the 501(c)3 Center for Computational Science Research.

== Partnerships and engagements ==
The OCC was among six partners engaged by the Global Lambda Integrated Facility to establish a testbed for a 100 Gbit/s data transmission capability.

The OCC is divided into Working Groups which include:

- The Open Science Data Cloud - This is a working group that manages and operates the Open Science Data Cloud (OSDC), which is a petabyte scale science cloud for researchers to manage, analyze and share their data. Individual researchers may apply for accounts to analyze data hosted by the OSDC. Research projects with TB-scale datasets are encouraged to join the OSDC and contribute towards its infrastructure.
- Project Matsu - Project Matsu is a collaboration between the NASA Goddard Space Flight Center and the Open Commons Consortium to develop open source technology for cloud-based processing of satellite imagery to support the earth science research community as well as human assisted disaster relief.
- The Open Cloud Testbed - This working group manages and operates the Open Cloud Testbed. The Open Cloud Testbed (OCT) is a geographically distributed cloud testbed spanning four data centers and connected with 10G and 100G network connections. The OCT is used to develop new cloud computing software and infrastructure.
- The Biomedical Data Commons - The Biomedical Data Commons (BDC) is cloud-based infrastructure that provides secure, compliant cloud services for managing and analyzing genomic data, electronic medical records (EMR), medical images, and other PHI data. It provides resources to researchers so that they can more easily make discoveries from large complex controlled access datasets. The BDC provides resources to those institutions in the BDC Working Group. It is an example of what is sometimes called condominium model of sharing research infrastructure in which the research infrastructure is operated by a consortium of educational and research organizations and provides resources to the consortium.
- NOAA Data Alliance Working Group - The OCC National Oceanographic and Atmospheric Administration (NOAA) Data Alliance Working Group supports and manages the NOAA data commons and the surrounding community interested in the open redistribution of NOAA datasets.

In 2015, the OCC was accepted into the Matter healthcare community at Chicago's historic Merchandise Mart. Matter is a community healthcare entrepreneurs and industry leaders working together in a shared space to individually and collectively fuel the future of healthcare innovation.

In 2015, the OCC announced a collaboration with the National Oceanic and Atmospheric Administration (NOAA) to help release their vast stores of environmental data to the general public. This effort is managed by the OCC's NOAA data alliance working group.

== Consortium members ==
=== US Cities ===
- City of Chicago

=== Companies ===
- Aerospace Corporation
- Booz Allen Hamilton
- Citrix
- Cisco
- CliQr
- The HDF Group
- Infoblox
- Force10
- Mercury Intelligence Systems
- Open Data Group
- Raytheon
- SIOS
- TexelTek
- UCAR/Unidata
- Yahoo
- Intel

=== Universities ===
- Calit2, University of California, San Diego
- Florida International University
- Johns Hopkins University
- StarLight, Northwestern University
- University of Chicago
- University of Illinois at Chicago
- Carnegie Mellon University
- NORC at the University of Chicago
- University of California, Berkeley (from 2012)
- The Geographic Information Systems Research Center at Feng Chia University, Taiwan (from October 2012)
- University of the West Indies
- Ontario Institute for Cancer Research
- The University of Edinburgh

=== Government agencies ===
- Lawrence Livermore National Laboratory
- NASA
- Oak Ridge National Laboratory
- National Institute of Advanced Industrial Science and Technology, Japan
