= The world wonders =

Security padding phrase used during the Battle of Leyte Gulf

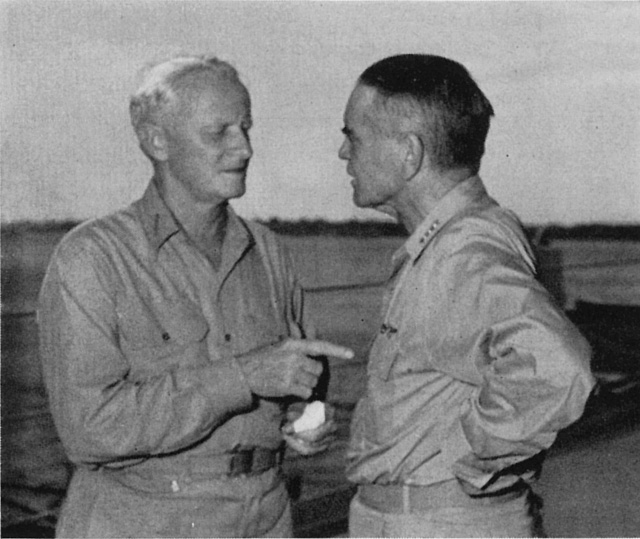
Nimitz (left) and Halsey in 1943

"The world wonders" is a phrase which rose to notoriety following (Note: The incident and phrase in question were recounted in the 1960 book The Great Sea War, edited by E. B. Potter and Nimitz.) its use during World War II when it appeared as part of a decoded message sent by Fleet Admiral Chester Nimitz, Commander in Chief, U.S. Pacific Fleet, to Admiral William Halsey Jr. at the height of the Battle of Leyte Gulf on October 25, 1944. The words, intended to be without meaning, were added as security padding in an encrypted message to hinder Japanese attempts at cryptanalysis but were mistakenly included in the decoded text given to Halsey. He interpreted the phrase as a harsh and sarcastic rebuke and as a consequence dropped his futile pursuit of a decoy Japanese carrier task force, and, belatedly, reversed some of his ships in a fruitless effort to aid United States forces in the Battle off Samar.

== Encryption strategy ==
During World War II, both basic and (for the time) sophisticated encryption ciphers were used. Some of these ciphers could be compromised through the recognition of predictable elements in the messages. For instance, messages might contain predictable intros or salutations such as "Dear" or "Sincerely." Today, that kind of vulnerability is referred to as a known-plaintext attack. At Bletchley Park, the Allies' codebreakers referred to these predictable elements as cribs, British schoolboy slang for a hidden cheat sheet smuggled into a test or exam. Cribs, based on educated guesses about parts of the plaintext (German messages, for instance, often ended with the words "Heil Hitler"), were an invaluable part of the Allies' own code-breaking strategies.

To combat pattern recognition in encrypted messages, methods such as adding unique, non-relevant padding phrases were employed. For example, the US Navy during World War II might transform a simple message like "Halsey: Come home. - CINCPAC" into "Road less taken nn Halsey: Come home. - CINCPAC rr bacon and eggs" for encrypted transmission. The padding, marked by two-character words, was added before encoding and removed after decoding.

World War II was a pivotal period in the evolution of modern cryptography. While the ciphers of that era were vulnerable to techniques like known-plaintext attacks, the field has since advanced significantly, and modern ciphers are designed to be resistant to such vulnerabilities.

== Background ==
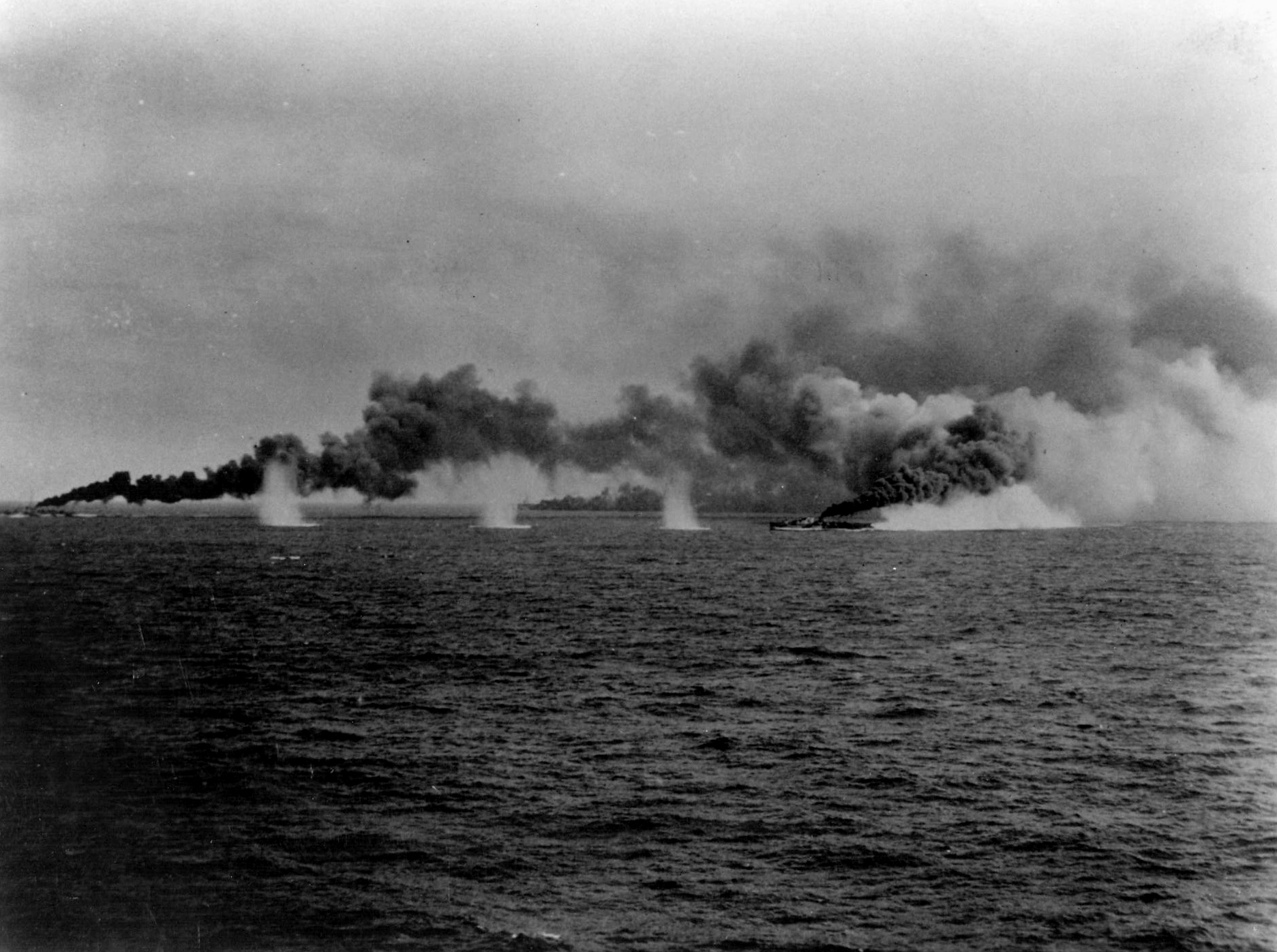
U.S. Navy destroyers and destroyer escorts laying a smoke screen during the Battle off Samar, 25 October 1944. Note the splashes from Japanese shells.

On October 20, 1944, United States troops invaded the island of Leyte as part of a strategy aimed at isolating Japan from the resource-rich territory it had occupied in South East Asia, and in particular depriving its forces and industry of vital oil supplies. The Imperial Japanese Navy (IJN) mobilized nearly all of its remaining major naval vessels in an attempt to defeat the Allied invasion. In the ensuing Battle of Leyte Gulf the Japanese intended to use ships commanded by Vice-Admiral Jisaburō Ozawa, "Northern Force", to lure the main American covering forces away from Leyte, thus allowing the main IJN forces, "Southern Force" and "Center Force", led by the 18-inch gunned super-battleship Yamato, the largest and most powerful ship afloat, to attack the invasion force in a pincer movement. Northern Force would be built around the four aircraft carriers of the 3rd Carrier Division (Zuikaku—the last survivor of the six carriers that had attacked Pearl Harbor in 1941—and the light carriers Zuihō, Chitose, and Chiyoda), but they would have very few aircraft or trained aircrew and serve merely as "bait."

William Halsey, in command of the mobile naval forces covering the invasion's northern flank, fell for the ruse. Convinced that Northern Force constituted the main Japanese threat, he proceeded northward in pursuit with the carriers of 3rd Fleet and a powerful force of battleships, designated Task Force 34. That left the landing beaches covered only by 16 escort carriers with about 450 aircraft from the 7th Fleet. On the morning of the 25th, a strong Japanese force of battleships slipped through the San Bernardino Strait headed toward the American landing forces, prompting their commander, Admiral Thomas C. Kinkaid, to send a desperate plaintext message asking for support.

== Nimitz's message ==
When Nimitz, at CINCPAC headquarters in Hawaii, saw Kinkaid's plea for help, he sent a message to Halsey, simply asking for the current location of Task Force 34, which a previous misunderstanding caused to be unclear:

Where is, repeat, where is Task Force Thirty Four?

With the addition of metadata including routing and classification information, as well as the padding at the head and tail, this entire plaintext message was to be encoded and transmitted to Halsey:

TURKEY TROTS TO WATER GG FROM CINCPAC ACTION COM THIRD FLEET INFO COMINCH CTF SEVENTY-SEVEN X WHERE IS RPT WHERE IS TASK FORCE THIRTY FOUR RR THE WORLD WONDERS

US Navy procedure called for the padding to be added to the start and end of the message, which were vulnerable to cryptanalysis because of the use of common phrases and words (such as "Yours sincerely") in those sections. The words chosen for padding should have been obviously irrelevant to the actual message, but Nimitz's enciphering clerk used a phrase that "[just] popped into my head." Historians note similarity to Lord Tennyson's poem "The Charge of the Light Brigade" about the eponymous battle, which was also fought on October 25 (1854), as the poem twice contains the phrase "All the world wonder’d".

While decrypting and transcribing the message, Halsey's radio officer properly removed the leading phrase, but the trailing phrase looked appropriate and he seems to have thought it was intended and so left it in before he passed it on to Halsey who read it as:

Where is, repeat, where is Task Force Thirty Four? The world wonders.

The structure tagging (the 'RR's) should have made clear that the phrase was in fact padding. In all the ships and stations that received the message, only the decoder on Halsey's flagship, USS New Jersey, failed to delete both padding phrases.

== Consequences ==
The message (and its trailing padding) became infamous and created some ill feeling since it appeared to be a harsh criticism by Nimitz of Halsey's decision to pursue the decoy carriers and leave the landings uncovered. "I was stunned as if I had been struck in the face," Halsey later recalled. "The paper rattled in my hands, I snatched off my cap, threw it on the deck, and shouted something I am ashamed to remember," letting out an anguished sob. Rear Admiral Robert Carney, Halsey's chief of staff (who had argued strongly in favor of pursuing the carriers), witnessed Halsey's emotional outburst and reportedly grabbed him by the shoulders and shook him, shouting, "Stop it! What the hell's the matter with you? Pull yourself together!" In Halsey's recollection, he called it an "infernally plausible" message and said, "I was so mad I couldn't talk. It was utterly impossible for me to believe that Chester Nimitz had sent me such an insult. He hadn't, of course, but I didn't know the truth for several weeks." Recognizing his failure, Halsey ordered his fleet south, however the chase north had exhausted the fuel of his light escorts and more time was wasted refueling while Taffy 3 (Task Unit 77.4.3, commanded by Rear Admiral Clifton Sprague) was fighting for its life. Halsey returned to Samar with his two fastest battleships, three light cruisers and eight destroyers, but he arrived too late to have any impact on the battle.

The anonymous ensign who wrote the message had an excellent reputation among his associates and a previously clean record; he was reprimanded and transferred to other duties. A 2019 article in the Proceedings magazine of the United States Naval Institute claimed to identify him as a sailor who had been promoted from the enlisted ranks for valor but had never been given formal training on drafting high-level coded communications.

== Sources ==
- Miller, Nathan (1982) [1977]. The U. S. Navy: an illustrated history. New York: Bonanza Books. pp. 366–71. ISBN 0-517-38597-X. OCLC 8493587.
