= Russian copulation =

Cryptographic method

In cryptography, Russian copulation is a method of rearranging plaintext before encryption to conceal stereotyped headers, salutations, introductions, endings, signatures, etc. That obscures clues for a cryptanalyst and can be used to increase cryptanalytic difficulty in naive cryptographic schemes; however, most modern schemes contain more rigorous defences: see ciphertext indistinguishability. Of course, that is desirable for those sending messages and wishing them to remain confidential. Padding is another technique for obscuring such clues.

The technique is to break the starting plaintext message into two parts and then to invert the order of the parts (similar to circular shift). That puts all endings and beginnings (presumably the location of most boilerplate phrases) "somewhere in the middle" of the version of the plaintext that is actually encrypted. For some messages, mostly those not in a human language (such as images or tabular data), the decrypted version of the plaintext will present problems when the inversion is reversed. For messages expressed in ordinary language, there is sufficient redundancy that the inversion can almost always be reversed by a human immediately on inspection.

The English phrase suggests that it originally came from an observation about Russian cryptographic practice. However, the technique is generally useful and neither was nor is limited to use by Russians.
