= Encryption =

Process of converting plaintext to ciphertext

A simple illustration of public-key cryptography, one of the most widely used forms of encryption

In cryptography, encryption is the process of transforming information in a way that, ideally, only authorized parties can decode. This process converts the original representation of the information, known as plaintext, into an alternative form known as ciphertext. Encryption does not itself prevent interference but denies the intelligible content to a would-be interceptor.

For technical reasons, an encryption scheme usually uses a pseudo-random encryption key generated by an algorithm. For a well-designed modern encryption scheme, decrypting ciphertext without the appropriate key should be computationally infeasible. An authorized recipient can easily decrypt the message with the key provided by the originator to recipients but not to unauthorized users.

Historically, various forms of encryption have been used to aid in cryptography. Early encryption techniques were often used in military messaging. Since then, new techniques have emerged and become commonplace in all areas of modern computing. Modern encryption schemes use the concepts of public-key and symmetric-key.

== History ==
=== Ancient ===
One of the earliest forms of encryption is symbol replacement, which was first found in the tomb of Khnumhotep II, who lived in 1900 BC Egypt. Symbol replacement encryption is "non-standard," which means that the symbols require a cipher or key to understand. This type of early encryption was used throughout Ancient Greece and Rome for military purposes. One of the most famous military encryption developments was the Caesar cipher, in which a plaintext letter is shifted a fixed number of positions along the alphabet to get the encoded letter. A message encoded with this type of encryption could be decoded with a fixed number on the Caesar cipher.

Around 800 AD, Arab mathematician al-Kindi developed the technique of frequency analysis – which was an attempt to crack ciphers systematically, including the Caesar cipher. This technique looked at the frequency of letters in the encrypted message to determine the appropriate shift: for example, the most common letter in English text is E and is therefore likely to be represented by the letter that appears most commonly in the ciphertext. This technique was made less effective by polyalphabetic ciphers, described by al-Qalqashandi (1355–1418) and Leon Battista Alberti (in 1465), which varied the substitution alphabet as encryption proceeded in order to confound such analysis.

=== 19th–20th century ===
Around 1790, Thomas Jefferson theorized a cipher to encode and decode messages to provide a more secure way of military correspondence. The cipher, known today as the Wheel Cipher or the Jefferson Disk, although never actually built, was theorized as a spool that could jumble an English message up to 36 characters. The message could be decrypted by plugging in the jumbled message to a receiver with an identical cipher.

A similar device to the Jefferson Disk, the M-94, was developed in 1917 independently by US Army Major Joseph Mauborgne. This device was used in U.S. military communications until 1942.

In World War II, Germany used the Enigma machine for encrypted military communications. The Enigma Machine was more complex because unlike the Jefferson Wheel and the M-94, each day the jumble of letters switched to a completely new combination. Each day's combination was only known by the Axis, so many thought the only way to break the code would be to try over 17,000 combinations within 24 hours. The Allies combined cryptanalytic techniques with electromechanical machines to reduce and test the plausible Enigma settings that had to be considered each day.

=== Modern ===
Today, encryption is used in the transfer of communication over the Internet for security and commerce. As computing power continues to increase, computer encryption is constantly evolving to prevent eavesdropping attacks. One of the first widely adopted modern block ciphers, Data Encryption Standard, used a 56-bit key with 72,057,594,037,927,936 possibilities; it was cracked in 1999 by EFF's brute-force DES cracker, which required 22 hours and 15 minutes to do so. Modern encryption standards often use stronger key sizes, such as AES (256-bit mode), TwoFish, ChaCha20-Poly1305, Serpent (supports keys up to 256 bits). AES-128 has a key space of 2^{128} possible keys, making exhaustive key search computationally infeasible with current technology. The most likely option for cracking ciphers with large key sizes is to find vulnerabilities in the cipher itself, like inherent biases and backdoors or by exploiting physical side effects through Side-channel attacks. For example, RC4, a stream cipher, was cracked due to inherent biases and vulnerabilities in the cipher.

== Encryption in cryptography ==
In the context of cryptography, encryption serves as a mechanism to ensure confidentiality. Since data may be visible on the Internet, sensitive information such as passwords and personal communication may be exposed to potential interceptors. The process of encrypting and decrypting messages involves keys. The two main types of encryption schemes are symmetric-key and public-key (also known as asymmetric-key) cryptography.

Many complex cryptographic algorithms often use simple modular arithmetic in their implementations.

=== Types ===
In symmetric-key schemes, the encryption and decryption keys are the same. Communicating parties must have the same key in order to achieve secure communication. The German Enigma Machine used a new symmetric-key each day for encoding and decoding messages.

In public-key cryptography schemes, the encryption key is published for anyone to use and encrypt messages. However, only the receiving party has access to the decryption key that enables messages to be read. Public-key encryption was first described in a secret document in 1973; beforehand, all encryption schemes were symmetric-key (also called private-key). Although published subsequently, the work of Diffie and Hellman was published in a journal with a large readership, and the value of the methodology was explicitly described. This work introduced the Diffie–Hellman key exchange, a method for establishing a shared secret over an insecure channel.

RSA (Rivest–Shamir–Adleman) is another notable public-key cryptosystem. Developed in 1977 and published in 1978, it is still used today for applications involving digital signatures. Using number theory, the RSA algorithm selects two prime numbers, which help generate both the encryption and decryption keys.

A publicly available public-key encryption application called Pretty Good Privacy (PGP) was written in 1991 by Phil Zimmermann, and distributed free of charge with source code. PGP was purchased by Symantec in 2010. Symantec's enterprise security business, which included PGP, was acquired by Broadcom for $10.7 billion in a deal completed on November 4, 2019; Broadcom retained the Symantec brand for this enterprise division, while the separate consumer-facing business was spun off and renamed NortonLifeLock.

== Uses ==
Encryption has long been used by militaries and governments to facilitate secret communication. It is now commonly used in protecting information within many kinds of civilian systems. For example, the Computer Security Institute reported that in 2007, 71% of companies surveyed used encryption for some of their data in transit, and 53% used encryption for some of their data in storage. Encryption can be used to protect data "at rest", such as information stored on computers and storage devices (e.g. USB flash drives). In recent years, there have been numerous reports of confidential data, such as customers' personal records, being exposed through loss or theft of laptops or backup drives; encrypting such files at rest helps protect them if physical security measures fail. Digital rights management systems, which prevent unauthorized use or reproduction of copyrighted material and protect software against reverse engineering (see also copy protection), is another somewhat different example of using encryption on data at rest.

Encryption is also used to protect data in transit, for example data being transferred via networks (e.g. the Internet, e-commerce), mobile telephones, wireless microphones, wireless intercom systems, Bluetooth devices and bank automatic teller machines. There have been numerous reports of data in transit being intercepted in recent years. Data should also be encrypted when transmitted across networks in order to protect against eavesdropping of network traffic by unauthorized users.

=== Regulatory compliance ===
Encryption plays a central role in meeting regulatory requirements for the protection of sensitive data. Under the HIPAA Security Rule, encryption of electronic protected health information (ePHI) is classified as an "addressable" implementation specification, meaning covered entities must implement it or document why an equivalent alternative measure is reasonable and appropriate. Notably, the HIPAA Breach Notification Rule provides a safe harbor for encrypted data: breaches involving ePHI that has been encrypted in accordance with NIST standards are not considered reportable breaches. A proposed update to the HIPAA Security Rule (NPRM, December 2024) would make encryption of ePHI at rest and in transit a mandatory requirement, removing its current "addressable" status.

The Payment Card Industry Data Security Standard (PCI DSS) requires stored primary account numbers (PANs) to be unreadable, using methods such as cryptography. It also requires cryptography to protect PAN transmitted over open, public networks.

=== Data erasure ===
Conventional methods for permanently deleting data from a storage device involve overwriting the device's whole content with zeros, ones, or other patterns – a process which can take a significant amount of time, depending on the capacity and the type of storage medium. Cryptography offers a way of making the erasure almost instantaneous. This method is called crypto-shredding. An example implementation of this method can be found on iOS devices, where the cryptographic key is kept in a dedicated 'effaceable storage'. Because the key is stored on the same device, this setup on its own does not offer full privacy or security protection if an unauthorized person gains physical access to the device.

== Limitations ==
Encryption is used in the 21st century to protect digital data and information systems. As computing power increased over the years, encryption technology has only become more advanced and secure. However, this advancement in technology has also exposed a potential limitation of today's encryption methods.

Key length is one factor that can affect the security of an encryption method. For example, the original encryption key, DES (Data Encryption Standard), was 56 bits, meaning it had 2^56 combination possibilities. With today's computing power, a 56-bit key is no longer secure, being vulnerable to brute-force attacks.

Quantum computing uses properties of quantum mechanics to perform certain computations in ways that differ from classical computers. Quantum computers are not faster than classical computers for all tasks, but certain quantum algorithms can offer speedups for specific problems. This computing power presents a challenge to today's encryption technology. For example, RSA encryption uses the multiplication of very large prime numbers to create a semiprime number for its public key. Decoding this key without its private key requires this semiprime number to be factored, which can take a very long time to do with modern computers. Factoring the large semiprimes used in properly generated modern RSA keys is computationally infeasible with current classical computers. A sufficiently large, fault-tolerant quantum computer could use Shor's algorithm to factor large integers in polynomial time. Such a quantum computer could compromise widely used public-key systems whose security depends on integer factorization or discrete logarithms, including RSA and elliptic-curve cryptography.

Quantum computing can also reduce the security margin of symmetric-key encryption. In particular, Grover's algorithm provides a theoretical quadratic speed-up for exhaustive key search.

While quantum computing could be a threat to encryption security in the future, quantum computing as it currently stands is still very limited. Quantum computers are commercially accessible, including through cloud services. Furthermore, quantum computing advancements will be able to be used in favor of encryption as well. The National Security Agency (NSA) is currently preparing post-quantum encryption standards for the future. Quantum encryption promises a level of security that will be able to counter the threat of quantum computing.

== Attacks and countermeasures ==
Encryption is an important tool but is not sufficient alone to ensure the security or privacy of sensitive information throughout its lifetime. Most applications of encryption protect information only at rest or in transit, leaving sensitive data in clear text and potentially vulnerable to improper disclosure during processing, such as by a cloud service for example. Homomorphic encryption and secure multi-party computation are emerging techniques to compute encrypted data; these techniques are general and Turing complete but incur high computational and/or communication costs.

In response to encryption of data at rest, cyber-adversaries have developed new types of attacks. These more recent threats to encryption of data at rest include cryptographic attacks, stolen ciphertext attacks, attacks on encryption keys, insider attacks, data corruption or integrity attacks, data destruction attacks, and ransomware attacks. Data fragmentation and active defense data protection technologies attempt to counter some of these attacks, by distributing, moving, or mutating ciphertext so it is more difficult to identify, steal, corrupt, or destroy.

== The debate around encryption ==
The question of balancing the need for national security with the right to privacy has been debated for years, since encryption has become critical in today's digital society. The modern encryption debate started around the '90s when US government tried to ban cryptography because, according to them, it would threaten national security. The debate is polarized around two opposing views. Those who see strong encryption as a problem making it easier for criminals to hide their illegal acts online and others who argue that encryption keep digital communications safe. The debate heated up in 2014, when Big Tech like Apple and Google set encryption by default in their devices. This was the start of a series of controversies that puts governments, companies and internet users at stake.

=== Integrity protection of Ciphertexts ===
Encryption, by itself, can protect the confidentiality of messages, but other techniques are still needed to protect the integrity and authenticity of a message; for example, verification of a message authentication code (MAC) or a digital signature usually done by a hashing algorithm or a PGP signature. Authenticated encryption algorithms are designed to provide both encryption and integrity protection together. Standards for cryptographic software and hardware to perform encryption are widely available, but successfully using encryption to ensure security may be a challenging problem. A single error in system design or execution can allow successful attacks. Sometimes an adversary can obtain unencrypted information without directly undoing the encryption. See for example traffic analysis, TEMPEST, or Trojan horse.

Integrity protection mechanisms such as MACs and digital signatures must be applied to the ciphertext when it is first created, typically on the same device used to compose the message, to protect a message end-to-end along its full transmission path; otherwise, any node between the sender and the encryption agent could potentially tamper with it. Encrypting at the time of creation is only secure if the encryption device itself has correct keys and has not been tampered with. If an endpoint device has been configured to trust a root certificate that an attacker controls, for example, then the attacker can both inspect and tamper with encrypted data by performing a man-in-the-middle attack anywhere along the message's path. The common practice of TLS interception by network operators represents a controlled and institutionally sanctioned form of such an attack, but countries have also attempted to employ such attacks as a form of control and censorship.

=== Ciphertext length and padding ===
Even when encryption effectively conceals a message’s content and prevents tampering, the length of the ciphertext remains a form of metadata that can leak sensitive information. For instance, the well-known CRIME and BREACH attacks against HTTPS exploited information leakage through encrypted message length as a side-channel attack. Traffic analysis more broadly refers to techniques that use metadata—such as message size and timing—to infer information about communication patterns.

Applying padding to a message before encryption can help obscure its true plaintext length, though this increases the ciphertext size and adds bandwidth overhead. Padding may be applied randomly or deterministically, each approach involving different trade-offs. Encrypting and padding data to produce padded uniform random blobs (PURBs) ensures that the ciphertext reveals no metadata about the plaintext’s structure, leaking only asymptotically minimal $O(\log\log M)$ information through its length.

== See also ==
- Cryptosystem
- Cold boot attack
- Cryptographic primitive
- Cryptography standards
- Cyberspace Electronic Security Act (US)
- Dictionary attack
- Disk encryption
- Encrypted function
- Enigma machine
- Export of cryptography
- Geo-blocking
- Indistinguishability obfuscation
- Key management
- List of cryptography software
- Multiple encryption
- Physical Layer Encryption
- Pretty Good Privacy
- Post-quantum cryptography
- Rainbow table
- Rotor machine
- Side-channel attack
- Substitution cipher
- Television encryption
- Tokenization (data security)
