= Encrypted function =

An encrypted function is an attempt to provide mobile code privacy without providing any tamper-resistant hardware. It is a method where in mobile code can carry out cryptographic primitives.

Polynomial and rational functions are encrypted such that their transformation can again be implemented, as programs consisting of cleartext instructions that a processor or interpreter understands. The processor would not understand the program's function. This field of study is gaining popularity as mobile cryptography.

== Example ==
Scenario: Host A, has an algorithm which computes function f. A wants to send its mobile agent to B which holds input x, to compute f(x). But A doesn't want B to learn anything about f.

Scheme: Function f is encrypted in a way that results in E(f). Host A then creates another program P(E(f)), which implements E(f), and sends it to B through its agent. B then runs the agent, which computes P(E(f))(x) and returns the result to A. A then decrypts this to get f(x).

Drawbacks: Finding appropriate encryption schemes that can transform arbitrary functions is a challenge. The scheme doesn't prevent denial of service, replay, experimental extraction and others.

== See also ==
- Homomorphic encryption
