= Battle off Samar =

Part of the Battle of Leyte Gulf

- Part of the Battle of Leyte Gulf, Philippines Campaign (1944–45), Pacific War (World War II)
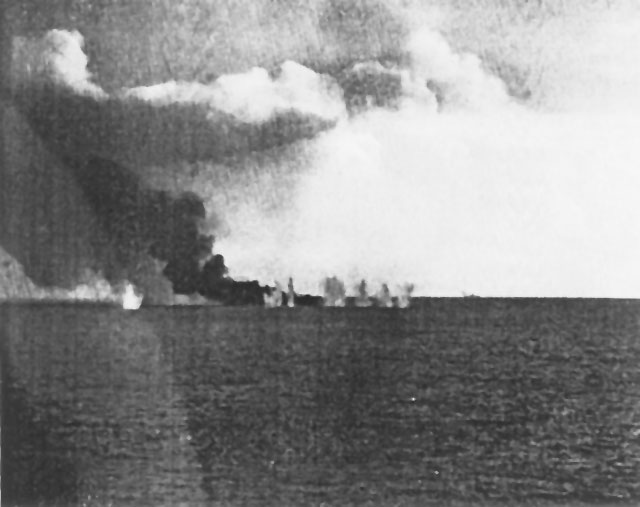
- The escort carrier Gambier Bay, burning from earlier gunfire damage, is bracketed by a salvo from a Japanese battleship (faintly visible in the background, center-right) shortly before sinking.
| Date | October 25, 1944 |
| Location | East of Samar |
| Result | American victory |

Belligerents
| United States | Japan |

Commanders and leaders
| Clifton Sprague | Takeo Kurita |

Units involved
| Seventh Fleet: Task Force 77; Task Group 77.4; Taffy 1; Taffy 2; Taffy 3 | Combined Fleet: 2nd Fleet; Center Force |

Strength
| 6 escort carriers (Taffy 3); 3 destroyers; 4 destroyer escorts; ~322 aircraft from Taffys 2 and 3 | 4 battleships; 6 heavy cruisers; 2 light cruisers; 11 destroyers; 36 aircraft (in kamikaze attack) |

Casualties and losses
| 2 escort carriers sunk; 2 destroyers sunk; 1 destroyer escort sunk; 23-29 aircraft lost; 4 escort carriers damaged; 1 destroyer damaged; 2 destroyer escorts damaged; 1,161 killed and missing; 913 wounded | 3 heavy cruisers sunk; 1 heavy cruiser damaged beyond repair; 11 aircraft lost; 2 battleships damaged; 2 heavy cruisers damaged; 1 light cruiser; 1 destroyer damaged; 2,700+ killed and wounded |

The Battle off Samar was the centermost action of the Battle of Leyte Gulf, one of the largest naval battles in history, which took place in the Philippine Sea off Samar Island, in the Philippines on October 25, 1944. It was the only major action in the larger battle in which the Americans were largely unprepared. After the previous day's fighting, the Imperial Japanese Navy's First Mobile Striking Force, under the command of Takeo Kurita, had suffered significant damage and appeared to be retreating westward. However, by the next morning, the Japanese force had turned around and resumed its advance toward Leyte Gulf. With Admiral William Halsey Jr. lured into taking his powerful Third Fleet north after a decoy fleet and the Seventh Fleet engaged to the south, the recently landed 130,000 men of the Sixth Army were left vulnerable to Japanese attack on Leyte.

Kurita, aboard the Japanese battleship Yamato, took his large force of battleships, cruisers and destroyers from the San Bernardino Strait and headed south toward Leyte, where they encountered Task Unit 77.4.3 ("Taffy 3"), the northernmost of the three escort carrier groups under Rear Admiral Clifton Sprague that comprised the only American forces remaining in the area. Composed of only six small escort carriers, three destroyers, and four destroyer escorts, Taffy 3 was intended to provide shore support and anti-submarine patrols, and did not have guns capable of penetrating the Japanese armor. The Japanese opened fire shortly after dawn, targeting Taffy 3's escort carriers, which Kurita mistook for the main carriers of the Third Fleet. The escort carriers fled for the cover of rain squalls and launched their aircraft in defense, while the three destroyers and destroyer escort USS Samuel B. Roberts, led by USS Johnston, launched a torpedo attack that sank one ship and sent the Japanese strike force into disarray.

With Taffy 2's aircraft joining the battle, the increasing severity of the air attack further convinced Kurita that he was engaging the Third Fleet's surface carriers. Satisfied with sinking what he believed were multiple carriers and worried the bulk of the Third Fleet was approaching, Kurita withdrew his fleet north at 0930 hrs., having failed to carry out his orders to attack the landing forces at Leyte Gulf. But for Taffy 3 a new threat was on its way. A little less than an hour later, at 1050 Japanese aircraft from the base at Luzon launched kamikaze attacks on the retreating American task force, sinking the escort carrier USS Saint Lo and damaging three others.

Taffy 3 sustained heavy losses in the action, losing two escort carriers, two destroyers, a destroyer escort and numerous aircraft. Over 1,000 Americans died, comparable to the combined losses of American men and ships at the Coral Sea and Midway. Three Japanese cruisers were sunk by air attack, and three others were damaged. The Japanese had over 2,700 casualties. Taffy 3 was awarded the Presidential Unit Citation and Captain Ernest E. Evans of the sunk Johnston was posthumously awarded the Medal of Honor. Fleet Admiral Chester W. Nimitz wrote afterwards that the success of Taffy 3 was "nothing short of special dispensation from the Lord Almighty." The Battle off Samar has been cited by historians as one of the greatest last stands in naval history.

== Background ==
The overall Japanese strategy at Leyte Gulf—a plan known as Shō-Go 1—called for Vice Admiral Jisaburō Ozawa's Northern Force to lure the American Third Fleet away from the Allied landings on Leyte, using an apparently vulnerable force of Japanese carriers as bait. The landing forces, stripped of air cover by the Third Fleet, would then be attacked from the west and south by Vice Admiral Takeo Kurita's Center Force and Vice Admiral Shoji Nishimura's Southern Force. Kurita's Center Force consisted of five battleships, including Yamato and Musashi, the largest battleships afloat, escorted by cruisers and destroyers. Nishimura's flotilla included two battleships and would be followed by Vice Admiral Kiyohide Shima's cruisers and destroyers.

On the night of October 23, the American submarines Dace and Darter detected Center Force entering the Palawan Passage along the northwest coast of Palawan Island. After alerting Halsey, the submarines torpedoed and sank two cruisers, while crippling a third and forcing it to withdraw. One of the cruisers lost was Admiral Kurita's flagship Atago, but he was rescued and transferred his flag to Yamato.

Subsequently, the carriers of the Third Fleet launched a series of air strikes against Kurita's forces in the Sibuyan Sea, damaging several vessels and sinking Musashi, initially forcing Kurita to retreat. At the same time, the Third Fleet light carrier Princeton was sunk by a Japanese bomb, with secondary explosions causing damage to a cruiser assisting alongside.

In the Battle of Surigao Strait, Nishimura's ships entered a deadly trap. Outmatched by the U.S. Seventh Fleet Support Force, they were devastated, running a gauntlet of torpedoes from 39 PT boats and 22 destroyers before coming under accurate radar-directed gunfire from six or seven battleships (five of them survivors of the Pearl Harbor attack) and seven cruisers. As Shima's force encountered what was left of Nishimura's ships, he decided to retreat, stating "If we continued dashing further north, it was quite clear that we should only fall into a ready trap."

At the Battle of the Sibuyan Sea, Halsey's Third Fleet savaged the Center Force, which had been detected on its way to landing forces from the north. Center Force lacked any air cover to defend against the 259 sorties from the five fleet carriers Intrepid, Essex, Lexington, Enterprise, and Franklin, and light carrier Cabot, the combination of which sank the massive battleship Musashi (sister to Yamato) with 17 bombs and 19 torpedoes.

Halsey's Third Fleet, having spotted Japanese carriers, engaged them in the Battle off Cape Engaño. Although ordered to destroy enemy forces threatening the Philippine invasion area, Halsey was also ordered by Nimitz to destroy a major portion of the Japanese fleet if the opportunity arose.

== Forces ==
The Japanese Center Force now consisted of the battleships Yamato, Nagato, Kongō, and Haruna; heavy cruisers Chōkai, Haguro, Kumano, Suzuya, Chikuma, Tone; light cruisers Yahagi, and Noshiro; and 11 destroyers; Yahagi led Yukikaze, Isokaze, Urakaze, and Nowaki; while Noshiro led Hayashimo, Akishimo, Fujinami, Hamanami, Kishinami, and Okinami. Shimakaze operated independently, but was overloaded with survivors and did not see action. The battleships carried a minimum of 14-inch (356 mm) guns, firing 1,400-pound (640 kg) shells over a range of more than 20 miles (32 km). The heavy cruisers carried 8-inch (203 mm) batteries plus torpedo tubes, and were capable of 35 knots (65 km/h). The Japanese destroyers outnumbered Sprague's eleven to three.

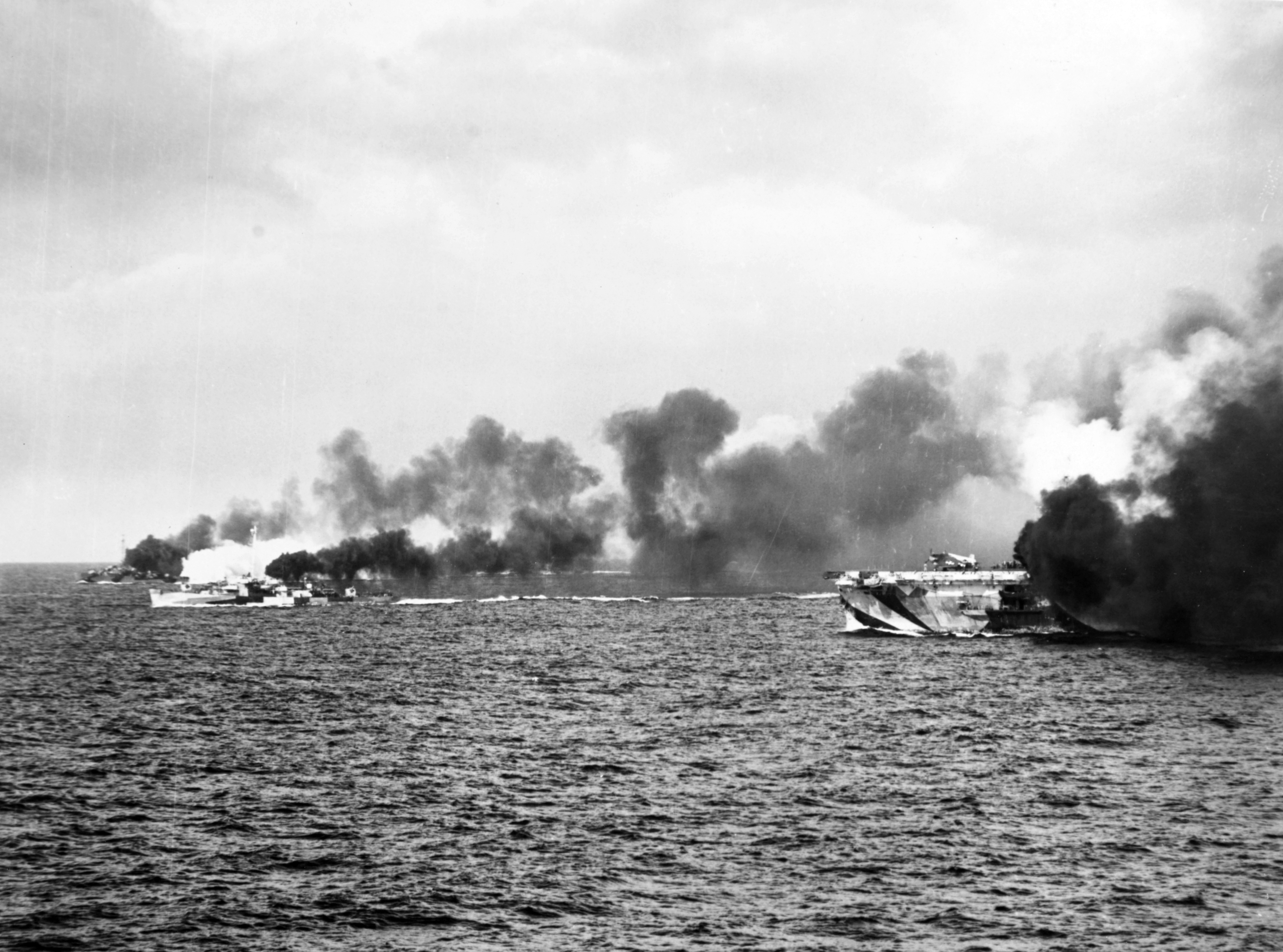
Gambier Bay and her escorts laying a smoke screen early in the battle.

Rear Admiral Clifton Sprague's Task Unit 77.4.3 ("Taffy 3") consisted of Fanshaw Bay, St. Lo, White Plains, Kalinin Bay, Kitkun Bay and Gambier Bay. Screening for Taffy 3 were the destroyers Hoel, Heermann and Johnston, and destroyer escorts Dennis, John C. Butler, Raymond, and Samuel B. Roberts. These six escort carriers carried about 165 aircraft, equivalent to two fleet carriers. Each carrier had a squadron composed of twelve to fourteen FM-2 Wildcat fighters and an equivalent number of Grumman TBF Avenger torpedo bombers. The carriers had a top speed of only 18 knots, far lower than the 30-knot Japanese cruisers and destroyers. None of his ships had a gun larger than 5 inches (127 mm), whose 54-pound (24 kg) shells were unable to penetrate Japanese cruiser or battleship armor, and had a range of just 7 miles (11 km).

== Battle ==
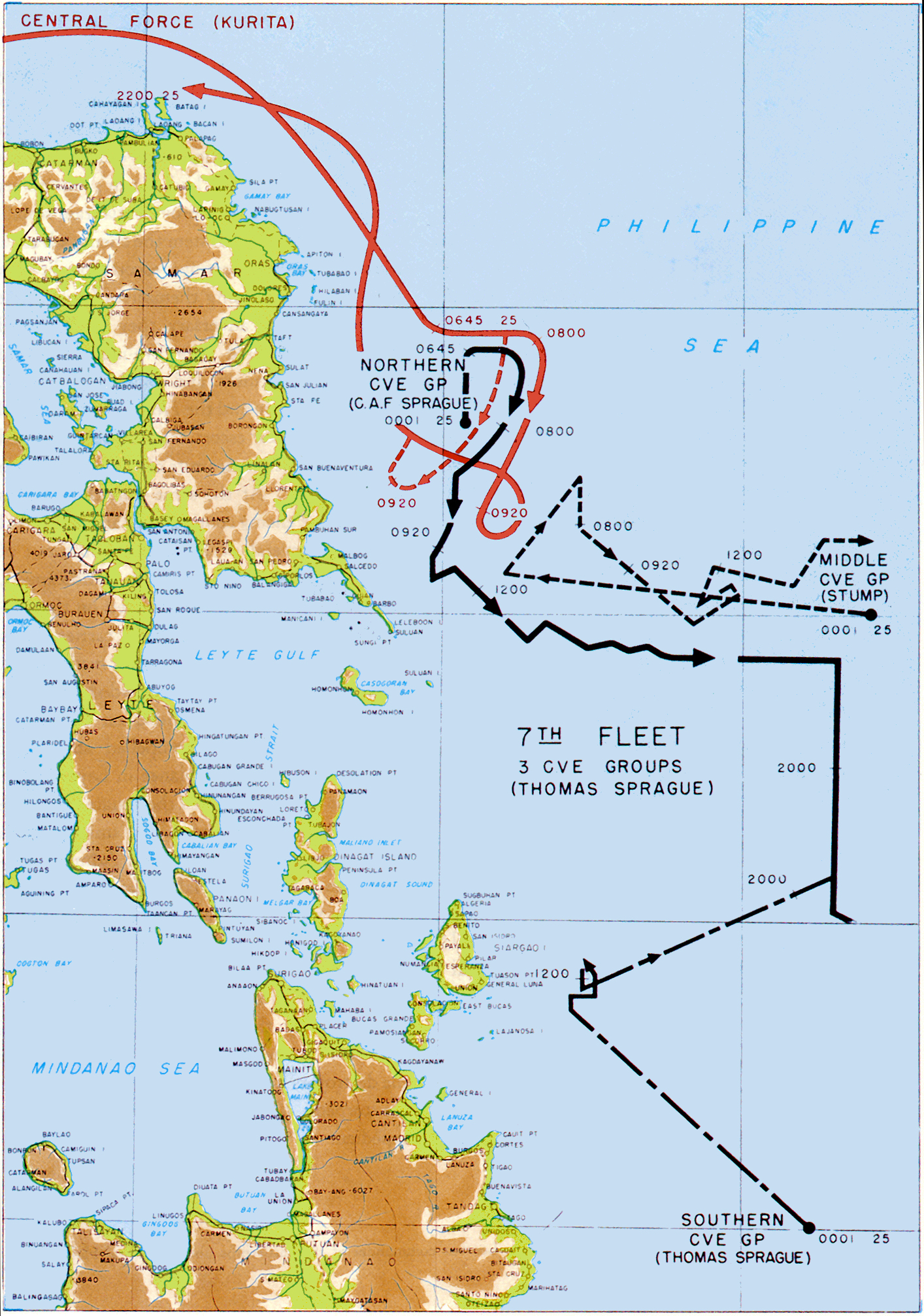
Movements during the battle

Kurita's force passed through San Bernardino Strait at 03:00 on October 25, 1944, and steamed southwards along the coast of Samar, hoping that Halsey had taken the bait and moved most of his fleet away as he had in fact done. Kurita had been advised that Nishimura's Southern Force had been destroyed at Surigao Strait and would not be joining his force at Leyte Gulf. However, Kurita did not receive the transmission from the Northern Force that they had successfully lured away Halsey's Third Fleet of battleships and fleet carriers. Through most of the battle, Kurita would be haunted by doubts about Halsey's actual location. The wind was from the North-Northeast and visibility was approximately 20 nmi (23 mi; 37 km) with a low overcast and occasional heavy rain squalls which the U.S. forces would exploit for concealment in the battle to come.

=== Taffy 3 comes under attack ===
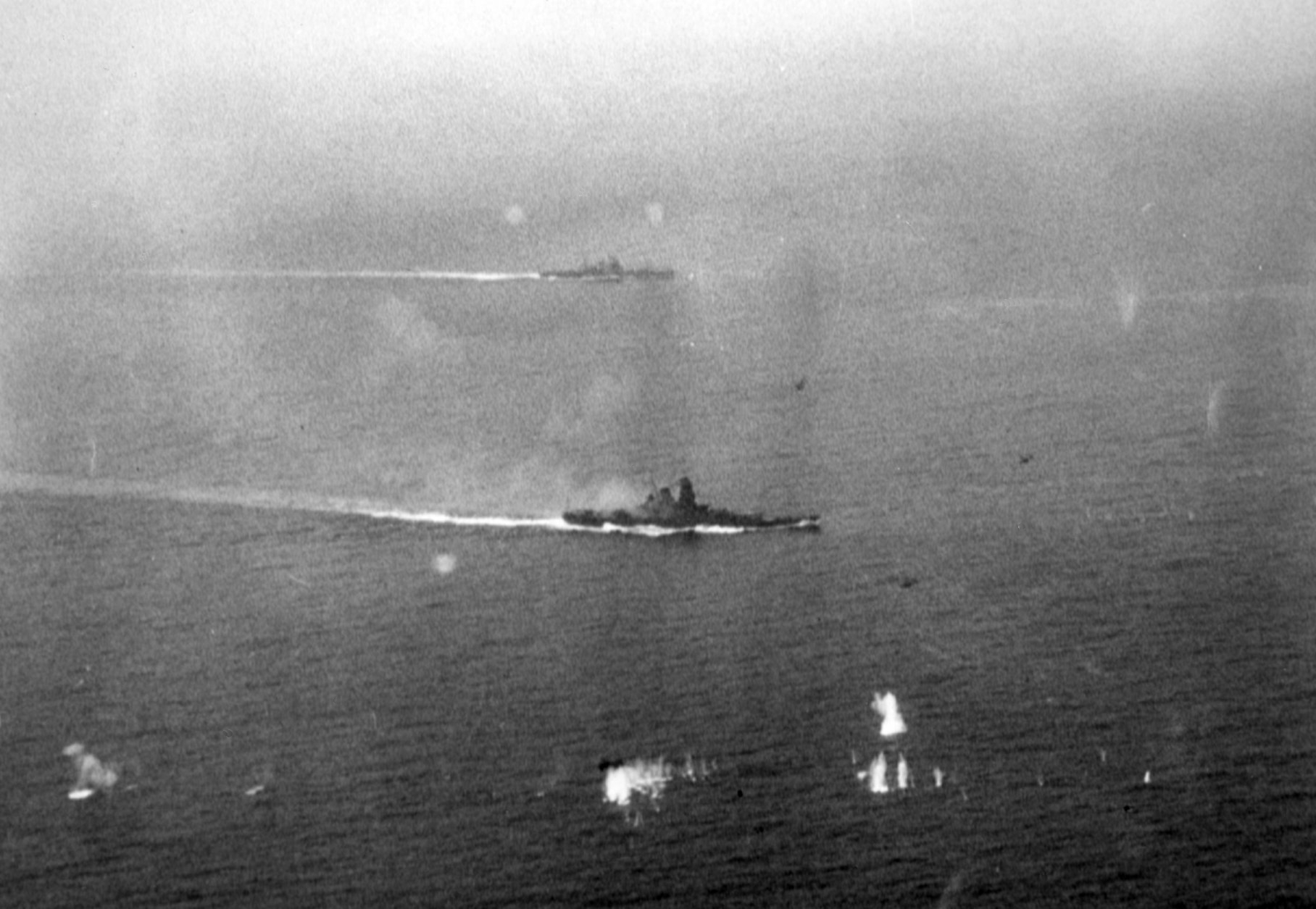
Japanese battleship Yamato and heavy cruiser Chikuma entering the battle. Yamato is the largest and most powerful battleship ever built

Steaming about 60 nmi (69 mi; 110 km) east of Samar before dawn on October 25, St. Lo launched a four-plane antisubmarine patrol while the remaining carriers of Taffy 3 prepared for the day's air strikes against the landing beaches. At 06:37, Ensign William C. Brooks, flying a Grumman TBF Avenger from St. Lo, sighted a number of ships expected to be from Halsey's Third Fleet, but they appeared to be Japanese. When he was notified, Admiral Sprague was incredulous, and he demanded positive identification. Flying in for an even closer look, Brooks reported, "I can see pagoda masts. I see the biggest meatball flag on the biggest battleship I ever saw!" Yamato alone displaced as much as all units of Taffy 3 combined. Brooks had spotted the largest of the three attacking Japanese forces, consisting of four battleships, six heavy cruisers, two light cruisers, and eleven destroyers.

They were approaching from the west-northwest only 17 nmi (20 mi; 31 km) away, and they were already well within gun and visual range of the closest task group, Taffy 3. Armed only with depth charges in case of an encounter with enemy submarines, the aviators nevertheless carried out the first attack of the battle, dropping several depth charges which just bounced off the bow of a cruiser.

The lookouts of Taffy 3 spotted the anti-aircraft fire to the north. The Japanese came upon Taffy 3 at 06:45, achieving complete tactical surprise. At about the same time, others in Taffy 3 had picked up targets from surface radar and Japanese radio traffic. At about 07:00, Yamato opened fire at a range of 17 nmi (20 mi; 31 km). Lacking the Americans' gunnery radars and Ford Mark I Fire Control Computer, which provided co-ordinated automatic firing solutions as long as the gun director was pointed at the target, Japanese fire control relied on a mechanical calculator for ballistics and another for own and target course and speed, fed by optical rangefinders. Color-coded dye loads were used in the battleships' armor-piercing shells so that the spotters of each ship could identify its own fall of shot, a common practice for the capital ships of many navies. The Americans, unfamiliar with battleship combat, were soon astonished by the spectacle of colorful geysers as the first volleys of shellfire found their range. Nagato used a brilliant pink; Haruna used a greenish-yellow variously described as green or yellow by the Americans; and Kongō used a blood-red dye which could appear red, purple, or even blue in some circumstances. Yamato used no dye loads, so her shell splashes appeared white.

Not finding the silhouettes of the tiny escort carriers in his identification manuals, Kurita mistook them for large fleet carriers and assumed that he had a task group of the Third Fleet under his guns. His first priority was to eliminate the carrier threat, ordering a "General Attack": rather than a carefully orchestrated effort, each division in his task force was to attack separately. The Japanese had just changed to a circular anti-aircraft formation, and the order caused some confusion, allowing Sprague to lead the Japanese into a stern chase, which restricted the Japanese to using only their forward guns, and restricted their anti-aircraft gunnery. Sprague's ships would not lose as much of their firepower in a stern chase, as their stern chase weapons were more numerous than their forward guns, and his carriers would still be able to operate aircraft.

=== The run to the East (06:45 to 07:15) ===
At 06:50 Admiral Sprague ordered a formation course change to 090, directed his carriers to turn to launch their aircraft and then withdraw towards a squall to the east, hoping that bad visibility would reduce the accuracy of Japanese gunfire. He ordered his escorts to the rear of the formation to generate smoke to mask the retreating carriers and ordered the carriers to take evasive action, "chasing salvos" to throw off their enemy's aim, and then launched all available FM-2 Wildcat fighter planes and TBM Avenger torpedo bombers with whatever armament they were already loaded with. Some had rockets, machine guns, depth charges, or nothing at all. Very few carried anti-ship bombs or aerial torpedoes which would have enabled aircraft to sink heavy armored warships. The Wildcats were deemed a better fit on such small aircraft carriers instead of the faster and heavier Grumman F6F Hellcats that were flown from the larger U.S. Navy carriers. Their pilots were ordered "to attack the Japanese task force and proceed to Tacloban airstrip, Leyte, to rearm and refuel". Many of the planes continued to make "dry runs" after expending their ammunition and ordnance to distract the enemy. At about 07:20 the formation entered the squall, and the Japanese fire slackened markedly as they did not have gunnery radar that could penetrate the rain and smoke.

Kurita meanwhile was already experiencing the consequences of ordering a General Attack, as his Fifth Cruiser and Tenth Destroyer Divisions cut across the course of the Third Battleship Division in their haste to close with the American carriers, forcing the battleship Kongō to turn north out of formation; Kongō acted independently for the remainder of the battle. Concerned that his destroyers would burn too much fuel in a stern chase of what he presumed were fast carriers while obstructing his battleships' line of fire, Kurita ordered his destroyers to the rear of his formation at 07:10, a decision which had immediate consequences, as the Tenth Destroyer Squadron was forced to turn away just as they were gaining on the right flank of the American formation. For the Second Destroyer Squadron, the consequences were more significant if less immediate: ordered to fall in behind Third Battleship Division, Yahagi and her accompanying destroyers steamed north from their position on the south side of Kurita's formation seeking division flagship Kongō, leaving no Japanese units in position to intercept the American carriers when they turned back south at 07:30. Despite his General Attack order, Kurita continued to dictate fleet course changes throughout the battle.

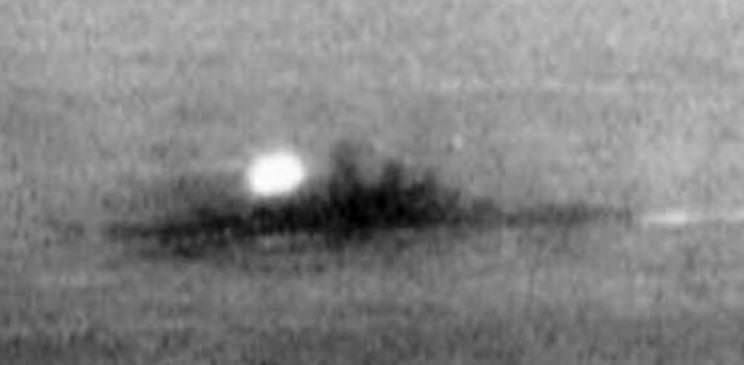
Yamato firing on USS White Plains. This is likely the salvo that damaged her

In the meantime, Yamato fired the first shots of the battle as her forward six 18.1-inch (46 cm) guns opened fire at the escort carrier White Plains at 35,000 yards. the first salvo contained four type 3 anti aircraft shells, and the rest were all armor piercing rounds. On the third salvo, one of these shells landed mere feet underneath White Plains' keel, disabling a boiler and electrical power. However, damage control brought these back online after 3 minutes. This did not change that Yamato's shell damaged White Plains' hull beyond repair, demoting her to an aircraft ferry in local waters after the battle. Yamato with four more salvos straddled the escort carrier Kitkun Bay multiple times, while Nagato straddled the escort carrier Saint Lo several times at 35,000 yards. However, the extreme range made gunfire mostly ineffective, prompting the battleships to cease firing. (Note: While many sources list the damage as a near miss, evidence does exist for Yamato scoring a direct hit. In a 2011 Navweaps forum post, Robert Lundgren accreted with photographic evidence that the 18.1-inch (46 cm) shell scraped off White Plains's hull before exploding underneath, thus counting as the longest ranged naval hit. He did not include this detail in the 2014 book he wrote on the battle)

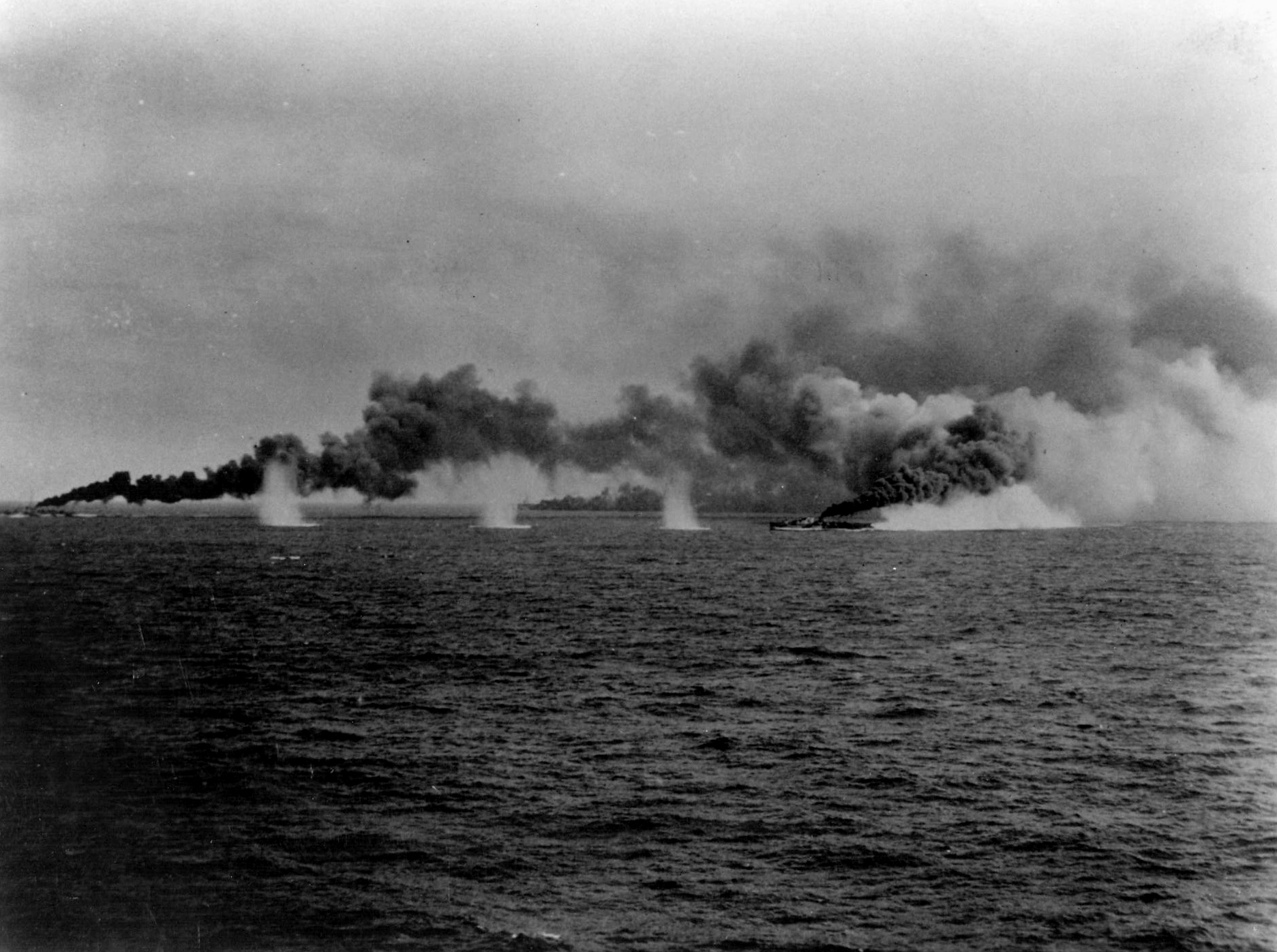
The destroyers USS Johnston and USS Hoel making smoke under fire.

Three destroyers and four smaller destroyer escorts had been tasked to protect the escort carriers from aircraft and submarines. The three Fletcher-class destroyers—affectionately nicknamed "tin cans" because they lacked armor—were fast enough to keep up with a fast carrier task force. Each had five single-mounted 5-inch (127 mm) guns and several light antiaircraft guns, none of which were effective against armored warships. Only their ten 21-inch (533 mm) Mark-15 torpedoes—housed in two swiveling five-tube launchers amidships—posed a serious threat to battleships and cruisers.

An advantage the American destroyers had was the radar-controlled Mark 37 Gun Fire Control System, which provided coordinated automatic firing of their 5-inch (127 mm) guns as long as the gun director was pointing at the target. A dual-purpose system, the Mark 37's gunfire radar and antiaircraft capabilities allowed the destroyers' guns to remain on target despite poor visibility and their own radical evasive maneuvering. The Japanese reliance on optical range finders aided by color-coded dye loads in each shell and mechanical calculators made it difficult for them to identify their targets through the rain and smoke and limited their ability to maneuver while firing. The different colored splashes the Japanese shells made as they hit the water by the American ships after a near miss prompted one White Plains sailor to quip "They're shooting at us in Technicolor!"

The four John C. Butler-class destroyer escorts were smaller and slower because they had been designed to protect slow freighter convoys against submarines. They were armed with two 5-inch (127 mm) guns without automatic fire control, and three torpedoes, although their crews rarely trained for torpedo attacks. Since the torpedoes had a range of only about 5.5 nmi (6.3 mi; 10.2 km), they were best used at night: during daylight, an attack on heavy warships would have to pass through a gauntlet of shellfire that could reach out to 25 nmi (29 mi; 46 km). In this battle they would be launched against a fleet led by the largest battleship in history, although it was the ships' ability to generate dense, heavy smoke from their funnels and chemical smoke generators which would most influence the course of the battle.

After laying down smoke to hide the carriers from Japanese gunners, they were soon making desperate torpedo runs, using their smoke for concealment. The ship profiles and aggressiveness caused the Japanese to think the destroyers were cruisers, and the destroyer escorts were full-sized destroyers. Their lack of armor allowed armor-piercing rounds to pass right through without exploding, until the Japanese gunners switched to high-explosive (HE) shells, which caused much more damage. Their speed and agility enabled some ships to dodge shellfire completely before launching torpedoes. Effective damage control and redundancy in propulsion and power systems kept them running and fighting even after they had absorbed dozens of hits before they sank, although the decks would be littered with the dead and the seriously wounded. Destroyers from Taffy 2 to the south also found themselves under shellfire, but as they were spotted by Gambier Bay, which had signaled for their assistance, they were ordered back to protect their own carriers.

=== Johnston's torpedo charge and subsequent attacks ===
At 7:00, Commander Ernest E. Evans of the destroyer Johnston responded to Japanese shell fire on the carriers of the group he was escorting by laying down a protective smokescreen and zigzagging. About 7:10, Gunnery Officer Robert Hagen began firing at the closest attackers, then 8.9 nmi (10 mi; 16 km) away, and registered several hits on the leading heavy cruisers. The Japanese ships targeted Johnston and soon shell splashes were bracketing the destroyer. Without consulting his commanders, Evans brought his ship to flank speed and headed toward the enemy.

Johnston’s charge led several Japanese ships to switch their fire from the carriers to the approaching American “cruiser”. Nagato and Haruna unleashed their main guns on Johnston, while Yamato fired 19 6.1-inc h (155 mm) shells from her secondary battery; all of this fire missed Johnston, sometimes narrowly. At 7:15, Hagen concentrated fire on Kumano, the flagship of the leading heavy cruiser squadron, setting fire to her superstructure with 5-inch (127 mm) shell. At a distance of 18,000 yards, Kumano and sistership Suzuya returned fire at 18,000 yards, ineffectively. Johnston closed to 10,300 yard, swerved to broadside, and dumped all ten of her torpedoes into the water. at 7:27, Kumano noticed three of Johnston's torpedoes swimming her way at 27 knots and attempted to turn to avoid, but it was too late. One mark 15 torpedo smashed into the cruiser and blew off her entire bow. Her speed was reduced to 12 knots in reverse as Suzuya stopped to remove Captain Teraoka from the crippled Kumano. However, as this was being done a flight of aircraft from Gambier Bay attacked the stationary cruiser and scored a bomb near miss which bent one of her port propellers, cutting Suzuya's speed to 22 knots and taking her out of the majority of the battle. After knocking two cruisers out of the fight, Johnston retreated as Japanese fire increased in intensity, yet not a single shell hit the victorious destroyer. Kumano was never repaired from the damage inflicted by Johnston, only fitted with a false bow and limited to 15 knots for the rest of her career, and finished off by mixed submarine and air attacks over the next month.

At 07:16, Sprague ordered Commander William Dow Thomas aboard Hoel, in charge of the small destroyer screen, to attack. Hoel began a long sprint to get into firing position for their torpedoes. At 07:20, Hoel located Kongō at 14,000 yards and sped to engage the battleship; this was a perfect opportunity as Kongō was blinded by rain squalls and was completely unaware of Hoel's presence. However, the same could not be said for the heavy cruiser Haguro, which noticed an enemy "cruiser" at 10,300 at 07:26 and opened fire. Haguro's first salvo scored a pair of 8-inch (203 mm) shell hits to Hoel's bridge and rangefinder, destroying her mark 37 director, FD radar, PPI scope, machine gun control, and all voice radio communications. Hoel commenced firing on Kongō as Haguro's second salvo landed an 8-inch (203 mm) hit to her forward fire room two feet above the waterline, then her third salvo landed three additional 8-inch (203 mm) shells hit started a powder fire in her turret 3 magazines, punctured and flooded her port engine and after generator, dropping her speed to 17 knots. In response, Hoel unloaded five torpedoes at the still blinded Kongō, right when three more 8-inch (203 mm) shells destroyed her turrets 4 and 5 and aft AA mounts. Haguro's final salvo landed a 5-inch (127 mm) shell which holed the destroyer below the waterline before she ceased fire and wrote off the enemy "cruiser" as sunk. For all this effort, Kongō noticed a spread of torpedoes some distance ahead of her and continued in a straight line. (Note: Contrary to Morrison's claim, Kongō was not forced to evade the torpedoes and continued in a straight line. Kongō was also not responsible for the initial crippling damage to Hoel, given the Japanese ship could not even see the American destroyer at 9,000 yards. The claims of a 14-inch (356 mm) shell hitting Hoel's bridge is based on nothing)

Mere minutes later, Johnston's luck began to run out as Yamato had been tracking the enemy "cruiser" which had torpedoed Kumano. Permission to fire the main battery was granted as the nine 18.1-inch (46 cm) guns aimed at the enemy and opened fire. Three first salvo 18.1-inch (46 cm) shells hit Johnston aft below the waterline, cutting her speed to 17 knots and destroying her 5-inch (127 mm) turrets 3, 4, and 5. Immediately afterwards, three first salvo 6.1-inch (155 mm) shells from Yamato's secondary battery tore into the destroyer, one hitting aft and destroying an AA director, while two hit the torpedo director and bridge, causing numerous casualties and severing the fingers of Commander Evans's left hand. The ship was mangled badly, with dead and dying sailors strewn across her bloody decks. Hagen and others repeated the myth that these were 14-inch (356 mm) shells from Kongō at 14,250 yards, who was still in a rain squall and could not even see Hoel at 9,000 yards. Noshiro and her destroyers recorded Yamato sinking an enemy ship. The rough estimation of the fall of the shell hits was 21,000 yards and 18 degrees; Yamato was at 20,300 yards at 17.5 degrees. However, Johnston was crippled but not sunk as she hid behind a rain squall and conducted damage control for 10 minutes as Yamato fired AP shells from her main guns that over-penetrated Johnston without exploding. Already depleted before the battle, her remaining store of oil did not fuel a catastrophic explosion.

=== Japanese advancement on the escort carriers ===
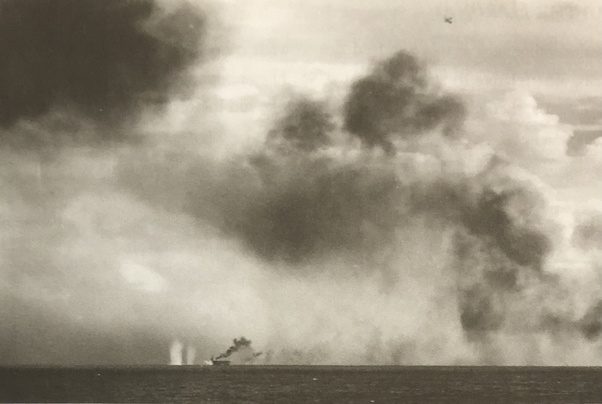
Escort carrier USS Kalinin Bay taking a 14-inch (356 mm) shell hit from the Japanese battleship Haruna

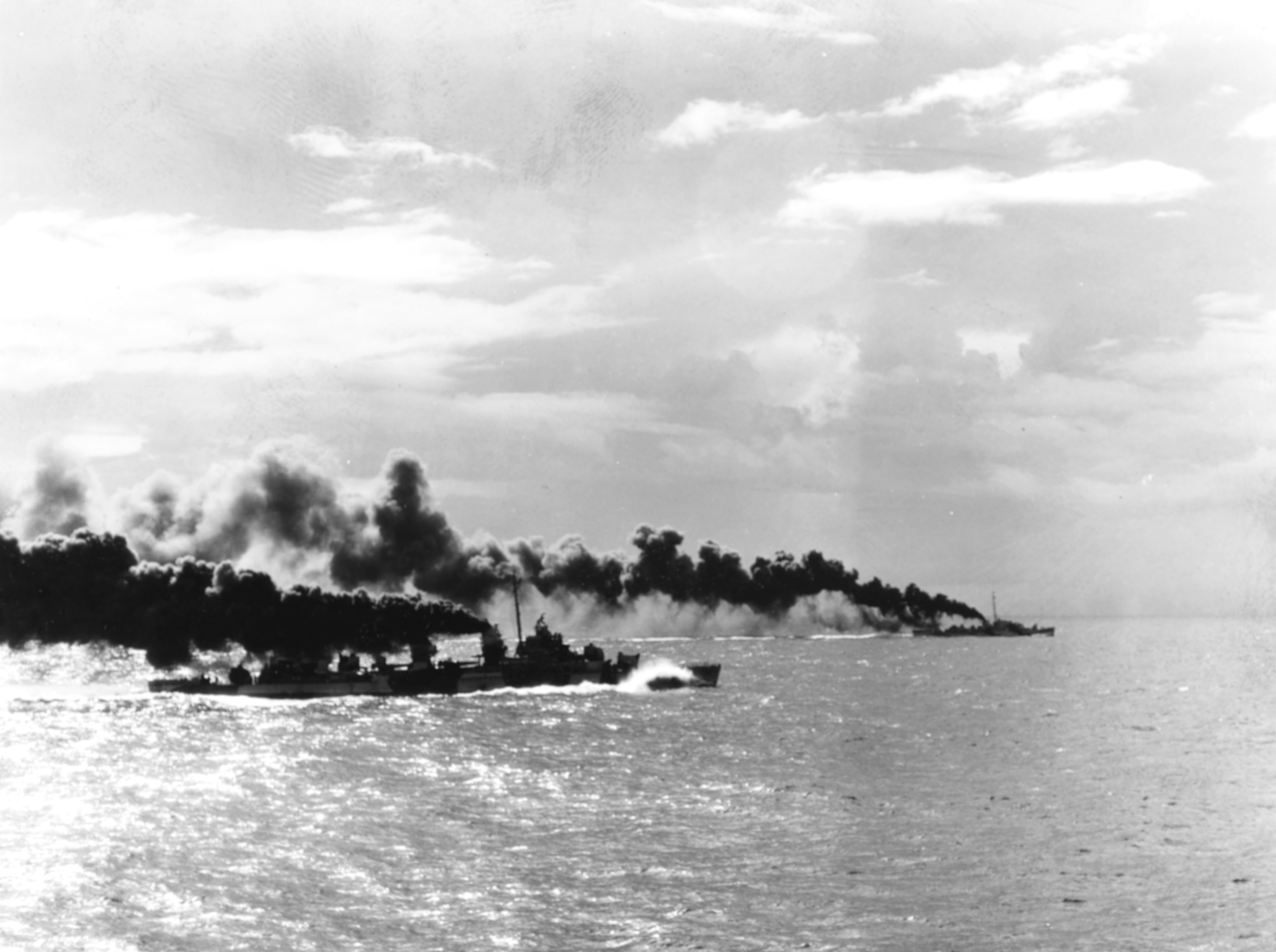
USS Heermann and a John C. Butler-class destroyer escort (likely Samuel B. Roberts) laying a smoke screen.

With the attempts by Johnston and Hoel to halt the Japanese dealt with for the time being, the fleet continued to close the range on the American escort carriers. Much of the gunfire for the next 20 minutes was focused on the destroyer escorts, John C. Butler and Raymond coming under heavy fire but not receiving a hit. Raymond and Dennis fired their torpedoes without obtaining a hit. However, solid hits were scored by 08:50 as Haruna fired on an enemy "destroyer" at 17,000 yards and claimed a hit after two salvos were fired before rain squalls blinded her. The range and bearing match the escort carrier Kalinin Bay, which was hit by a 14-inch (356 mm) shell. Meanwhile, the Japanese heavy cruisers began to close the range, with Chikuma leading Tone, Haguro, and Chōkai. Haguro fired on the escort carrier Fanshaw Bay at 17,200 yards and landed a pair of 8-inch (203 mm) hits to her forward flight deck, before briefly firing on Heermann. Just after 08:00, Haguro switched fire to the Kalinin Bay and in a running gunnery duel in which Tone joined in, Kalinin Bay was hit by three 8-inch (203 mm) - two hitting the stern and one hitting the bow - while Haguro in turn took two hits from Kalinin Bay's lone 5-inch (127 mm) gun that damaged her radio transmitter and communication cables. However, critical damage came at 07:25 when Fanshaw Bay aircraft took vengeance on her opponent and gouged Haguro with a pair of 100 pound bombs which exploded inside her turret 2 magazines, starting a powder fire which forced the cruiser to conduct damage control.

Simultaneously, destroyer Heermann and destroyer escort Samuel B. Roberts had finished screening the escort carriers and rushed into action at 08:45. Samuel B. Roberts still carried torpedo tubes (which were removed on many destroyer escorts), and Lieutenant Commander Robert W. Copeland decided to make use of them. Samuel B. Roberts was functionally a miniature destroyer, equipped with two 5-inch (127 mm) guns and a triple torpedo tube mount, and only designed for 26 knots, intended for light escorting duties and anti-submarine warfare. However, by raising pressure to 660 pounds per square inch (4,600 kPa) and diverting all available steam to the ship's turbines, Samuel B. Roberts obtained 28.7 knots. At the same time, the still wounded Hoel had five more torpedoes on deck and limped to expend the rest. At 07:50, Hoel spotted what she claimed was a cruiser column, but was actually the Japanese battleships and closed to engage. Yamato and Nagato located Hoel and took her under fire; Nagato with all her guns at 9,400 yards and Yamato with her secondary battery at 6,300 yards. One of Nagato's 16.1-inch (41 cm) shells hit below her bridge alongside a flurry of 5.5-inch (14 cm) and 6.1-inch (155 mm) secondary shell hits destroying her forward engine room and generator, shredding her superstructure, and causing a 10 degree list to port. However, this did not stop Hoel from dumping the rest of her torpedoes at her opponent's position. Yamato and Nagato turned away to avoid the attack, and though no torpedo hits were scored, the Japanese battleships' evasive maneuvers forced them out of the action for 20 minutes and took Kurita out of command on the Japanese side.

Heermann endured a similar counter when at 07:50 she correctly identified the heavy cruiser column, and took the leading Chikuma under fire. After an exchange of gunnery which landed no hits on either side, Heermann fired seven of her ten torpedoes at Chikuma, which again landed no hits. At the same time, the crippled but still bloodthirsty Johnston rejoined the action and joined Heermann in an exchange of fire with an enemy "cruiser" at 08:00. Japanese records show Haruna opened fire on an enemy "cruiser" at that exact same time matching the destroyer's range and bearing, and was in all likelihood Johnston's and Heermann's opponent. Heermann and Johnston almost collided, but turned away around 200 yards from each other. Finally, Samuel B. Roberts enacted a gunnery duel with the Chōkai, and scored multiple 5-inch (127 mm) shell hits. The extent and of damage is unknown since no Chōkai sailors survived to account the hits. In turn, Samuel B. Roberts took a pair of 8-inch (203 mm) shells hits which temporarily jammed her torpedo mount and aft turret. However, they were quickly brought back into service and all three torpedoes were fired at her opponent. A torpedo hit was claimed and the crew believed they had blown off Chōkai's stern, but Japanese reports fail to support this. (Note: Historians often Heermann with the torpedo spread that forced Yamato out of the battle before Lundgren proved Hoel accomplished that feat.)

=== Taffy 3's losses ===
After this point, three Japanese battleships returned to the scene. Yamato and Nagato were recovering from Hoel's torpedo spread and had Taffy 3 in their crosshairs, while Kongō had finally left the rain squall and chased the far off action, and the presence of the Japanese flagship took effect as the nearest escort carrier, the Gambier Bay, was targeted by a first salvo from Haruna and Yamato and hit by battleship caliber shell that passed through the very aft end of the flight deck. (Note: Lundgren theorizes this is probably from Haruna.) However, at 08:17 the first definitive 18.1-inch (46 cm) shell sliced through Gambier Bay's forward hangar bay, before at 08:20, another 18.1-inch (46 cm) shell hit Gambier Bay below the waterline and sliced through her aft engine room, causing major flooding and immediately cutting her speed to 10 knots. Yamato followed up with another pair of 18.1-inch (46 cm) hits at 08:23, one hitting below the waterline and causing more major flooding – destroying her machine shop and some freshwater tanks – and the other slicing through her bow.

At around the same time, Samuel B. Roberts closed to point blank range and took Chikuma under fire. Chikuma turned to engage, but could score no hits as Samuel B. Roberts was now so close that Chikuma's 8-inch (203 mm) guns could not be pressed down low enough for an accurate shot. Heermann also took Chikuma under fire, and 5-inch (127 mm) shell hits began to pile up on the leading Japanese heavy cruiser while the Americans took little damage in turn.

At 08:20, Kongō briefly shot at Johnston, and in turn had forty 5-inch (127 mm) shells launched back at her. At 08:23, Kongō fired on Gambier Bay and claimed gunnery hits. Kongō probably witnessed the hits scored by Yamato, which matched the range, bearing, and firing angle of said hits. At 08:30, Kalinin Bay's break ended as the light cruiser Yahagi, leading the destroyers Yukikaze, Isokaze, Urakaze and Nowaki, fired a spread of 24 torpedoes at 15,000 yards, some of which came dangerously close to hitting the carrier until fighters destroyed them with strafing runs. However, things went from bad to worse as Tone and Haguro had recommenced firing on Kalinin Bay, and to great effect. Most of next eleven 8-inch (203 mm) shell hits were scored after 08:40 when Tone and Haguro had closed to 10,100 yards. Many hits passed through the flight deck and hangar bay, starting a large fire, while near misses flooded seawater into the ship. Most dangerously, an 8-inch (203 mm) shell holed Kalinin Bay below the waterline, passed through the ship, and detonated after coming out the other side and hitting the water, effectively acting as a near miss. This shell disabled the ship's fuel lines, shredded her forward bulkhead, and put the ship in serious danger. White Plains and Kitkun Bay meanwhile came under fire from Chōkai, which straddled both carriers multiple times.

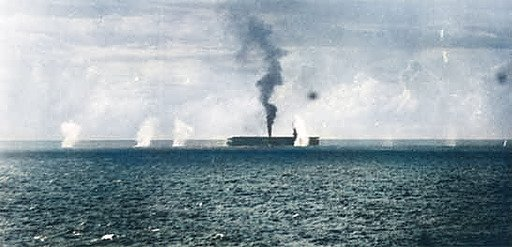
USS Gambier Bay photographed at 08:43 the moment a salvo of shells began to hit the ship. This salvo will destroy the forward engine room and leave her dead in the water, leading her to be abandoned. This appears to be from Yamato's main battery, given six splashes are spotted and two land later than the rest, corresponding with her ripple firing in which the middle barrel was fired after the left and right barrel to reduce shell dispersion

The plight of Gambier Bay had only continued during this period. Yamato's gunfire set a massive fire inside the hangar bay and caused more flooding. Going off of older sources, Gambier Bay's sinking is often credited to Japanese heavy cruisers, particularly Chikuma. The story goes that Chikuma recognized Gambier Bay as an escort carrier, and the cruisers switched to high explosive 8-inch (203 mm) rounds and closed to point blank range, sinking Gambier Bay between 08:10 to 09:11. However, Chikuma was engaged in a gunnery duel with Heermann and Samuel B. Roberts by the time Gambier Bay took her first hit, and never fired on the escort carriers again. As for the other cruisers, Tone and Haguro focused their fire on the escort carriers Kalinin Bay; Chōkai probably engaged White Plains and Kitkun Bay. The surviving records from the Japanese cruisers also never correctly identified their targets, reporting either "Ranger-class aircraft carriers" or "Independence-class light carriers", and all damage inflicted to the other escort carriers were by armor piercing 8-inch (203 mm) shells. Most of this came from earlier accounts of the battle off Samar being based on U.S. accounts without taking Japanese records into perspective. Regardless, at 08:43 Gambier Bay took a shell hit which destroyed her forward engine room, leaving her dead in the water. The abandon ship order was issued as Gambier Bay began to sink, prompting Yamato to cease fire and for the light cruiser Noshiro to close the range and fire on a disabled and listing "Independence-class light carrier". The sinking Gambier Bay received multiple high explosive shell hits at this time period which killed evacuating crew members. Gambier Bay capsized at 09:07 and fully sank at 09:11 with the loss of 147 sailors.

Hoel was searching for targets as to draw fire from the escort carriers when Yamato and Nagato noticed an enemy "cruiser" and opened fire at 9,000 yards, Nagato with all her guns and Yamato with her secondary battery only, her main guns still being focused on Gambier Bay. Hoel fired with her forward guns, hitting the light cruiser Noshiro with a 5-inch (127 mm) shell which killed 1 sailor and wounded 3 others, but a mix of 5.5-inch, 6.1-inch, and 16.1-inch gunfire got the better of her as a hit destroyed her last boiler. Dead in the water, Hoel quickly accumulated hits from Yamato's and Nagato's shells, and was set ablaze as her forward magazines ignited and practically every function on the ship became disabled. After sustaining over 40 shell hits, at 08:40 Hoel listed at 20 degrees as the crew attempted to abandon ship. The destroyer Isokaze inspected the sinking destroyer, and although her crew wished to machine-gun the survivors as revenge for U.S. pilots strafing Japanese survivors in the water, Captain Maeda forbade such an attack. Still, Isokaze sailed off without rescuing the survivors as Hoel finally rolled over and sank at 08:55 with the loss of 253 sailors. About 86 to 89 crew members on Hoel survived out of a complement of over 300, while 253 men died with the ship. Survivors spent roughly two days in the water, facing shark attacks and injuries, before some of them were lucky enough to be rescued.

Things were going more successfully for Samuel B. Roberts and Heermann who through all of this continued to blast Chikuma. Samuel B. Roberts ran out of high explosive 5-inch (127 mm) shells and switched to armor piercing rounds, then to training rounds, and finally to star shells. The star shells in particular engulfed Chikuma's deck in flames as together Heermann and Samuel B. Roberts hit Chikuma with some 200 5-inch (127 mm) shells. Chikuma's turret 3 was destroyed, and her bridge, superstructure, and deck were all set ablaze as American aircraft took her under fire as well. However, Heermann took the brunt of the Japanese fire and took multiple 8-inch (203 mm) shell hits from Chikuma which destroyed her bridge, forward turrets, and steering room while two 14-inch (356 mm) near misses from Kongō exploded below her keel and flooded her bow so badly her anchors were dragging in the water. Heermann retreated to lay a smokescreen across the rear formation.

Almost entirely out of ammunition, Samuel B. Roberts attempted to withdraw to the escort carriers, only for the Kongō to track an American destroyer and open fire. With three salvos, two of her 6-inch (152 mm) secondary shells hit the destroyer escort, one passing through the aft superstructure, and the other hitting below the waterline and knocking out her forward boilers, cutting her speed to 17 knots. Kongō then fired a single main battery salvo, scoring three or four 14-inch (356 mm) shell hits which caused the destroyer to lose all power and stop dead in the water. The abandon ship order was issued as Samuel B. Roberts sank by the stern over 40 minutes with the loss of 90 men.

Johnston stood her ground against Noshiro, attempting to cover the sinking Gambier Bay, when Commander Evans noticed something grand. Johnston crew watched what appeared to be seven enemy destroyers - with a "Terutsuki class" destroyer taking the lead - closing on the escort carriers. This was actually the light cruiser Yahagi leading the destroyers Yukikaze, Isokaze, Urakaze and Nowaki preparing another torpedo attack on Taffy 3. Outnumbered, outgunned, and still badly wounded by Yamato's gunfire, Johnston limped towards the five enemy ships and attempted to cross their T, only for Yahagi and her destroyers to turn broadside and bring all their guns to bear. Regardless, Johnston opened fire and claimed to hit Yahagi twelve times; a single 5-inch (127 mm) shell did hit Yahagi and exploded inside her port side officer's stateroom. Yahagi in turn opened fire, scoring at least one critical 6-inch (152 mm) shell hit which sliced through Johnston's turret 2, killing everyone inside and leaving Johnston with just a single functional gun. Aircraft warded off Yahagi, but salvation did not come as Yukikaze, Isokaze, Urakaze, and Nowaki smothered Johnston in 5-inch (127 mm) gunfire. Shell hits destroyed her last 5-inch (127 mm) gun as well as her remaining boilers and engine; punctured in her bridge, radio room, and superstructure; blew off her forward funnel; damaged her forward torpedo mount; and started a large fire next to her bridge which forced her command staff to evacuate to the stern. The Suzuya had also finally returned to the battle at this point and fired four salvos at Johnston, scoring at least two hits. At 09:45, the abandon ship order was issued as the crew began to evacuate. Yukikaze inspected Johnston and pumped one last salvo into the destroyer to make sure she sank, then came alongside the sinking destroyer, not for an attack, but to salute the crew for their bravery. Crew members lined up on Yukikaze's deck as commander Terauchi Masamichi was seen saluting the ship by Robert Billie and others. Yukikaze's sailors noticed commander Evans on a lifeboat saluting back with tears in his eyes. Johnston fully capsized and sank just after 10:00 with 186 lives lost. Commander Ernest E. Evans was not among the eventually rescued survivors. (Note: U.S. reports often state there were six destroyers led by Japanese cruiser Yahagi, but only four destroyer squadron 10 ships were present: Yukikaze, Isokaze, Urakaze, and Nowaki.)

Of the three US destroyers in the battle only USS Heerman did not sink. Heerman is best remembered as the only American destroyer of "Taffy 3" to survive the chaotic Battle off Samar. Despite sustaining heavy damage and hits the destroyer survived the battle. Later the Heerman was repaired and brought back into service during World War 2.

=== Japanese losses ===
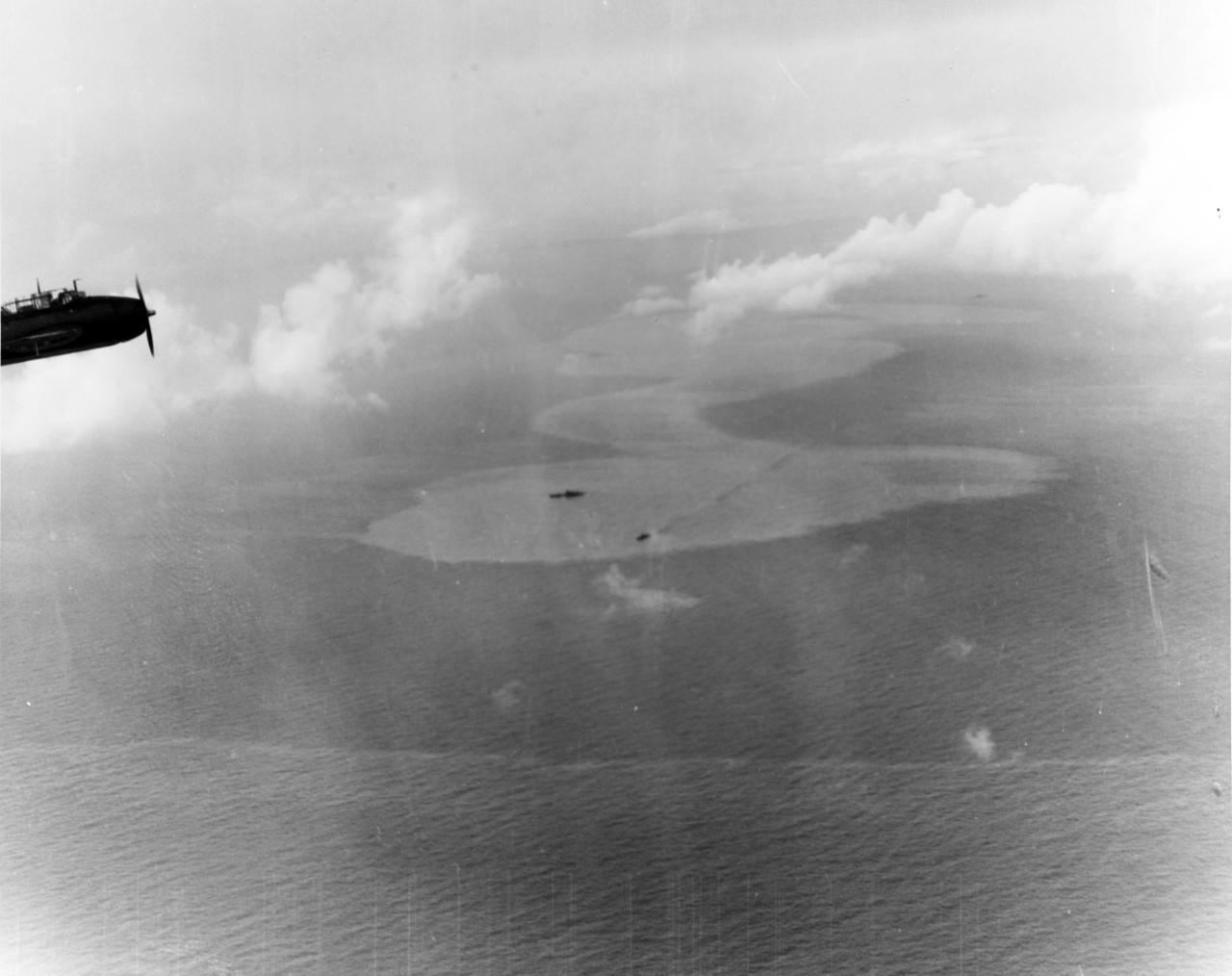
Japanese destroyer Nowaki preparing to assist sinking heavy cruiser Chikuma. The fatally wounded heavy cruiser Chōkai is seen in the distance

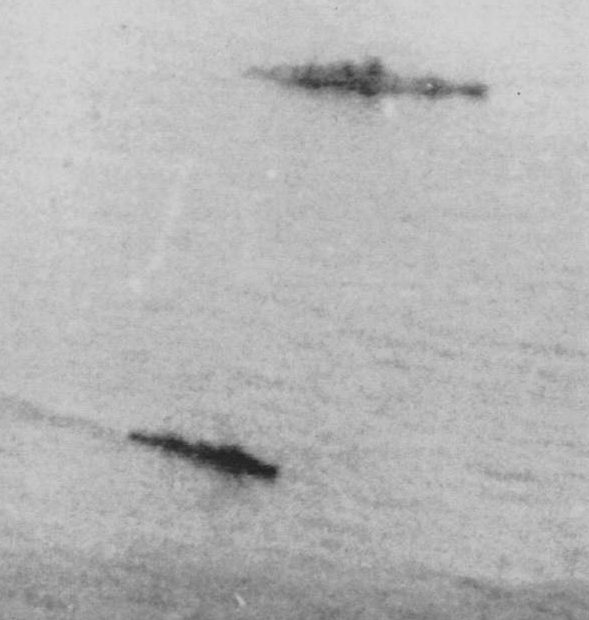
A closer photo of Chikuma and Nowaki

By 08:55, Tone and Haguro took aim upon Fanshaw Bay; Tone scored one 8-inch (203 mm) hit while Haguro landed three. Two shells hit the forward part of the flight deck and cut through electrical wires, starting a series of fires in the hangar bay, while the other two holed Fanshaw Bay's bow above the waterline. At 09:00, Haguro fired on Dennis at 14,500 yards and hit the destroyer escort with four 8-inch (203 mm) shells, two hit the aft superstructure, one hit the bow below the waterline, and a final shell sliced through and destroyed her forward 5-inch (127 mm) gun turret. However, this was juxtaposed by the plight of two Japanese heavy cruisers. White Plains meanwhile had engaged in a gunnery duel with Chōkai, and seemed to hit her opponent with at least six 5-inch (127 mm) shells. Before this continued, a flight of dive bombers from Kitkun Bay attacked Chōkai, which failed to maneuver, and dropped a 500 pound high explosive bomb down Chokai's main funnel, detonating her engine and boilers and leaving the cruiser dead in the water with immense flooding. Chōkai radioed to Yamato she was disabled, and it was decided she could not be saved in the moment. Japanese destroyer Fujinami removed Chōkai's crew before scuttling her with torpedo hits. During this event, Fujinami also discovered drifting sailors of the sunken Gambier Bay, and allegedly saluted the crew. (Note: Chōkai was not sunk by a 5-inch (127 mm) shell from White Plains which hit her torpedo tubes, as accreted by Hornsficsher and many others. Chōkai's radio message and the extensive reports of surrounding ship document aircraft bombs sinking the cruiser. The final nail in the coffin came with the discovery of Chōkai's wreck, showing the torpedo tubes were completely intact.)

Chikuma had finished losing a gunfight to Heermann and Samuel B. Roberts when – perhaps due to a mix of that fact and being the lead Japanese cruiser – it became the main focus of American torpedo bombers. Four TBM Avenger torpedo-bombers attacked Chikuma, and Richard Deitchman, flying from USS Manila Bay, succeeded in hitting the cruiser's stern port quarter with a Mark 13 torpedo that severed the stern and disabled its port screw and rudder. Chikuma's speed dropped to 18 knots (33 km/h), then to 9 knots (17 km/h), but more seriously, she became unsteerable. At 11:05, Chikuma was attacked by five TBMs from Kitkun Bay and hit portside amidships by two torpedoes and its engine rooms flooded. At 14:00, three TBMs from a composite squadron of ships from USS Ommaney Bay and USS Natoma Bay led by Lt. Joseph Cady dropped more torpedoes which hit Chikuma portside. Cady was later awarded the Navy Cross for his action. Chikuma began to sink as the destroyer Nowaki came to assist the sinking heavy cruiser, removed her crew, and left the cruiser to slip beneath the waves.

=== Kurita withdraws ===
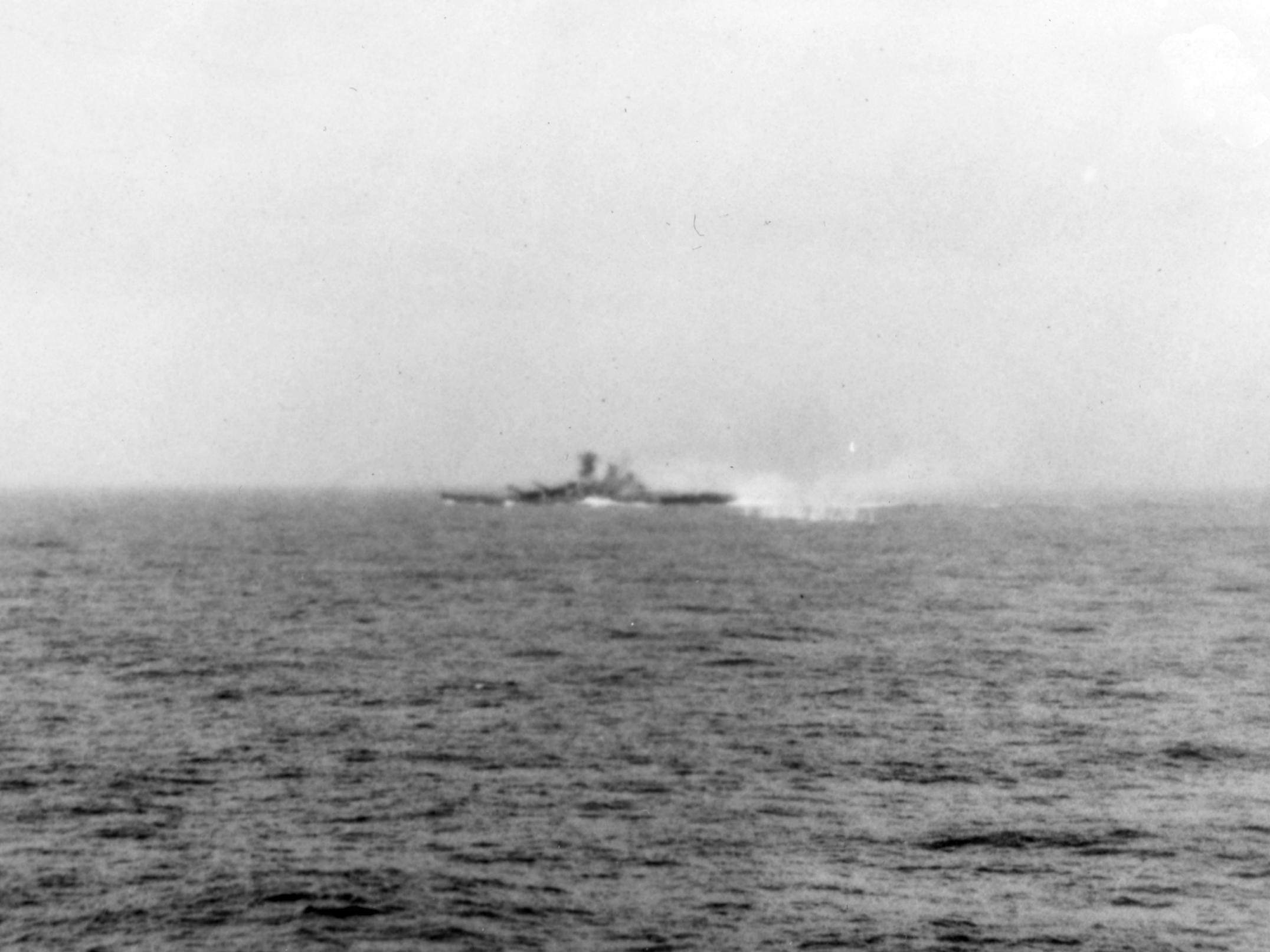
Yamato under attack by aircraft at 10:30

Although Kurita's battleships had not been seriously damaged, the air and destroyer attacks had broken up his formations, and he had lost tactical control. His flagship Yamato had been forced to turn north in order to avoid torpedoes, causing him to lose contact with much of his task force. The determined, concentrated sea and air attack from Taffy 3 had already sunk or crippled the heavy cruisers Chōkai, Kumano, and Chikuma, which seemed to confirm to the Japanese that they were engaging major fleet units rather than escort carriers and destroyers. Kurita was at first not aware that Halsey had already taken the bait and that his battleships and carriers were far out of range. The ferocity of the renewed air attacks further contributed to his confusion and reinforced his suspicion that Halsey's aircraft carriers were nearby. Signals from Ozawa eventually convinced Kurita that he was not currently engaged with the entirety of Third Fleet, and that the remaining elements of Halsey's forces might close in and destroy him if he lingered too long in the area.

Finally, Kurita received word that the Southern Force that he was to meet had been destroyed the previous night. Calculating that the fight was not worth further losses and believing he had already sunk or damaged several American carriers, Kurita broke off the engagement at 09:20 with the order: "all ships, my course north, speed 20." He set a course for Leyte Gulf but became distracted by reports of another American carrier group to the north. Preferring to expend his ships against capital ships, rather than transports, he turned north after the non-existent enemy fleet and ultimately withdrew back through the San Bernardino Strait. Heermann was turning in circles evading the Japanese attack, when the gunfire suddenly stopped, leaving Heermann as the only American destroyer to survive the battle.

As he retreated north and then west through the San Bernardino Strait, the smaller and heavily damaged American force continued to press the battle. While watching the Japanese retreat, Admiral Sprague heard a nearby sailor exclaim, "Damn it, boys, they're getting away!". Another yelled "Just wait a little longer, boys, we're suckering them into 40-mm range". Their wishes were not wasted as at 10:50, the damaged Suzuya was waddling at 20 knots when a flight of Kitkun Bay aircraft attacked the heavy cruiser and scored multiple straddles and near misses, which detonated her starboard torpedoes and shredded the cruiser, blasting off her aft 5-inch (127 mm) secondary guns, destroying the starboard engines and boilers, and engulfing the ship in flames which, when they reached the remaining torpedoes and 5-inch (127 mm) ammunition, caused further destruction. The abandon ship order was issued as the destroyer Okinami evacuated the sinking Suzuya and rescued 620 men; 247 Suzuya sailors perished.

=== Kamikaze attacks ===
Just as Taffy 3 was becoming engaged in the early morning a new and separate threat began. The recently constituted Japanese Special Attack Units launched their first successful preplanned and intentional suicide Kamikaze attacks. U.S. 7th Fleet's Task Unit 77.4.1, Call Sign "Taffy 1", was attacked at 0740 that morning with impacts and damage to two vessels. The Japanese fleet had withdrawn at 0920, but Taffy 3 was then attacked again, by Kamikaze aircraft, less than two hours later at 1050. At 10:10, the American ships had secured from general quarters. 10 minutes later saw the crew relieved to get coffee and a chance to relax, but the fight was not done yet. Just before 11:00, a flight of planes – believed to be a mix of enemy and friendly – were seen above between 1,000 and 3,000 feet to the starboard side of USS Saint Lo. These were in fact a flight of Japanese Kamikazes from land based air fields. A trio of A6M5 Zeros raced towards the already crippled Kalinin Bay, and despite the carrier's AA defenses the first of them smashed onto her flight deck near the starboard quarter, violently exploded, before what was left of the plane slid off the port bow. This was followed very closely by a second A6M5 striking the port stack, catwalk, and 20 mm mount before its remains crashed into the water and exploded, causing mild damage from a small bomb near miss. The third Zero missed Kalinin Bay and crashed in the water 50 yards away to port. Two more A6M5s attacked White Plains, one of which just barely missed the carrier by two inches and sprayed debris over the ship. Another five A6M5 Zeros dove down to attack Kitkun Bay, one of which missed the bridge but crashed into the port catwalk, causing its bomb to explode midair and set fire to the jeep carrier.

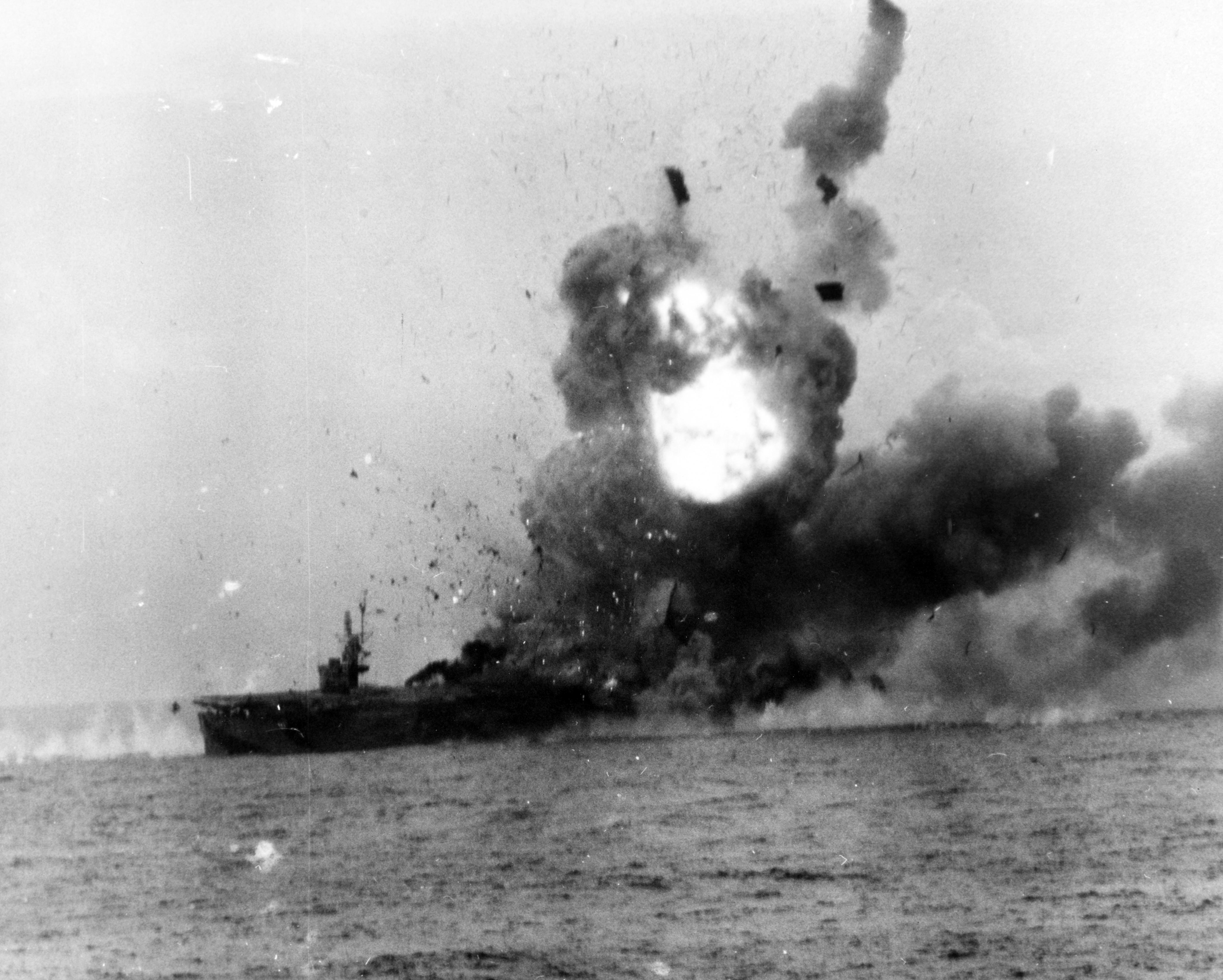
USS Saint Lo exploding after being hit by a kamikaze

The greatest achievement of this attack came when an A6M5 Zero flown by Lieutenant Yukio Seki originally dove his plane – with a bomb on each wing – down to attack White Plains, but was hit by AA fire from his target. He instead took his damaged plane and flew it to the direction of Saint Lo. In his sacrifice, his plane struck the flight deck at the number 5 wire, with the impact detonating both of the Zero's attached bombs. Captain McKenna had not felt that his ship was seriously damaged aside a hole in the flight deck which had water hoses placed into action to stop the fire encasing it. However, damage control was not effective enough as the fire quickly spread to the hangar bay and drenched it in smoke. McKenna attempted contact with the hangar deck, but communications were out. Before any further reactions could take place, a massive explosion engulfed the aft section of the hangar bay, followed by a third and fourth much stronger detonation which blasted the flight deck open and blew off the aircraft elevator. McKenna could not even tell if the rear section of Saint Lo was still attached as the abandon ship order was immediately issued and all engines screeched to a halt. This proved fortunate as a fifth explosion listed the ship to port, then three more further shredded the escort carrier and hauled her to starboard. Saint Lo sank a half hour later with the loss of 113 men, while her surviving crew were rescued by Heermann and the surviving destroyer escorts.

=== Seventh Fleet's calls for help ===
Shortly after 08:00, desperate messages calling for assistance began to come in from Seventh Fleet. One from Vice Admiral Thomas C. Kinkaid, sent in plain language, read, "My situation is critical. Fast battleships and support by airstrikes may be able to keep enemy from destroying CVEs and entering Leyte."

At 08:22, Kinkaid radioed, "Fast Battleships are Urgently Needed Immediately at Leyte Gulf".

At 09:05, Kinkaid radioed, "Need Fast Battleships and Air Support."

At 09:07, Kinkaid broadcast what his mismatched fleet was up against: "4 Battleships, 8 Cruisers Attack Our Escort Carriers."

3,000 nmi (3,500 mi; 5,600 km) away at Pearl Harbor, Admiral Chester W. Nimitz had monitored the desperate calls from Taffy 3, and sent Halsey a terse message: "Where is TF 34?" To complicate decryption, communications officers were to add a nonsense phrase at both ends of a message; in this case, it was prefixed with "Turkey trots to water" and suffixed with "The world wonders." The receiving radioman repeated the "where is" section of the message and his staff failed to remove the trailing phrase "the world wonders." A simple query by a distant supervisor had, by the random actions of three sailors, become a stinging rebuke.

Halsey was infuriated since he did not recognize the final phrase as padding, which had possibly been chosen for the 90th anniversary of the Charge of the Light Brigade. He threw his hat to the deck and began to curse.

Halsey sent Task Group 38.1 (TG 38.1), commanded by Vice Admiral John S. McCain, to assist. Halsey recalled that he did not receive the vital message from Kinkaid until around 10:00 and later claimed that he had known that Kinkaid was in trouble but had not dreamed of the seriousness of the crisis. McCain, by contrast, had monitored Sprague's messages and turned TG 38.1 to aid Sprague even before Halsey's orders arrived (after prodding from Nimitz), putting Halsey's defense in question.

At 10:05, Kinkaid asked, "Who is guarding the San Bernardino Strait?"

McCain raced toward the battle and briefly turned into the wind to recover returning planes. At 10:30, a force of Helldivers, Avengers, and Hellcats was launched from Hornet, Hancock, and Wasp at the extreme range of 330 nmi (380 mi; 610 km). Although the attack did little damage, it strengthened Kurita's decision to retire.

At 11:15, more than two hours after the first distress messages had been received by his flagship, Halsey ordered TF 34 to turn around and head south to pursue Kurita, but the Japanese forces had already escaped.

Just hours after his perceived chastisement by Nimitz, Halsey's forces destroyed all four enemy aircraft carriers that he had pursued. However, despite the complete absence of Third Fleet against the main Japanese force, the desperate efforts of Taffy 3 and assisting task forces had driven back the Japanese. A relieved Halsey sent the following message to Nimitz, Kinkaid and General Douglas MacArthur at 12:26: "It can be announced with assurance that the Japanese Navy has been beaten, routed and broken by the Third and Seventh Fleets."

=== Survivors' ordeal ===
Partly as a result of disastrous communication errors within Seventh Fleet and a reluctance to expose search ships to submarine attack, a very large number of survivors from Taffy 3, including those from Gambier Bay, Hoel, Johnston, and Samuel B. Roberts, were not rescued until October 27, after two days adrift. A plane had spotted the survivors, but the location radioed back was incorrect. By then, many had died as a result of exposure, thirst and shark attacks. Finally, when a Landing Craft Infantry of Task Group 78.12 arrived, its captain used what is almost a standard method of distinguishing friend from foe, asking a topical question about a national sport, as one survivor, Jack Yusen, relates:

We saw this ship come up, it was circling around us, and a guy was standing up on the bridge with a megaphone. And he called out 'Who are you? Who are you?' and we all yelled out 'Samuel B. Roberts!' He's still circling, so now we're cursing at him. He came back and yelled 'Who won the World Series?' and we all yelled 'St. Louis Cardinals!' And then we could hear the engines stop, and cargo nets were thrown over the side. That's how we were rescued.

== Aftermath ==
The Japanese had succeeded in luring Halsey's Third Fleet away from its role of covering the invasion fleet, but the remaining light forces proved to be a very considerable obstacle. The force that Halsey had unwittingly left behind carried about 450 aircraft, comparable to the forces of five fleet carriers, although of less powerful types, and not armed for attacks on armored ships. The ships themselves, although slow and almost unarmed, in the confusion of battle and aided by weather and smokescreens, mostly survived. Their aircraft, although not appropriately armed, sank and damaged several ships, and did much to confuse and harass Center Force.

The breakdown in Japanese communications left Kurita unaware of the opportunity that Ozawa's decoy plan had offered him. Kurita's mishandling of his forces during the surface engagement further compounded his losses. Despite Halsey's failure to protect the northern flank of the Seventh Fleet, Taffy 3 and assisting aircraft turned back the most powerful surface fleet Japan had sent to sea since the Battle of Midway. Domination of the skies, prudent and timely maneuvers by the U.S. ships, tactical errors by the Japanese admiral, and superior American radar technology, gunnery and seamanship all contributed to this outcome.

In addition, accurate anti-aircraft fire and air cover over U.S. ships shot down several kamikazes, while Center Force, lacking air cover, was vulnerable to air attack and was forced to constantly conduct evasive maneuvers while under air attack. Lastly, the attacking Japanese force initially used armor-piercing shells which were largely ineffective against unarmored ships as they passed right through without exploding; such munitions can be ineffective against thinly-armored naval targets such as destroyers or destroyer escorts.

Kurita and his officers knew they could not conduct a high-speed chase after the small force without a fleet oiler, and it contradicted with the original plan orders, which prioritized the landing forces over anything else. Kurita then received a cryptic message ordering him north, and in a unanimous decision with his officers ordered his force northward toward Ozawa's force, where he thought a surface battle between the Northern Force and an American fleet was about to take place.

Well, I think it was really just determination that really meant something. I can't believe that they didn't just go in and wipe us out. We confused the Japanese so much. I think it deterred them. It was a great experience.

— Thomas Stevensen, Survivor of Samuel B. Roberts

Clifton Sprague's task unit lost two escort carriers: Gambier Bay, to surface attack, and St. Lo, to kamikaze attack. Of the seven screening ships, fewer than half, two destroyers (Hoel and Johnston) and a destroyer escort (Samuel B. Roberts), were lost, as were several aircraft. The other four U.S. destroyers and escorts were damaged. Although it was such a small task unit, over 1,500 Americans died, comparable to the losses suffered at the Allied defeat of the Battle of Savo Island off Guadalcanal, when four cruisers were sunk. It was also comparable to the combined losses of the 543 men and 3 ships at the Battle of the Coral Sea, and 307 men and 2 ships at the Battle of Midway.

However, a few small and replicable American warships could not compare to the three heavy cruisers lost, Chōkai, Chikuma, and Suzuya. The heavy cruiser Kumano was also damaged beyond repair by gunfire and torpedoes from Johnston, enabling her to be finished off by mixed submarine and air attacks over the next month. Nearly 3,000 Japanese sailors lost their lives. Of the six U.S. ships, totaling 37,000 long tons (38,000 t), lost during Leyte Gulf operations, five were from Taffy 3. The Japanese lost 26 ships, totaling 306,000 long tons (311,000 t), in Leyte Gulf combat.

=== Follow up attacks ===
Furthermore, the attacks chasing Kurita's fleet after the battle were quite effective. Right after midnight during the start of 26 October, the Nowaki was steaming independently from Kurita's fleet in the San Bernardino Strait when she was located on radar by Admiral Halsey's surface ships, including the battleships USS Iowa and USS New Jersey which the destroyer had escaped the gunfire of earlier that February during Operation Hailstone. In response, the light cruisers USS Vincennes, USS Miami, and USS Biloxi opened fire on the enemy "cruiser" and blasted Nowaki into a floating wreck before the destroyer USS Owen landed a torpedo hit that delivered Coup de Grace and sank Nowaki with all hands, including all of the Chikuma survivors the destroyer had rescued. (Note: A single Chikuma survivor which was not rescued by Nowaki drifted ashore and was rescued by US forces)

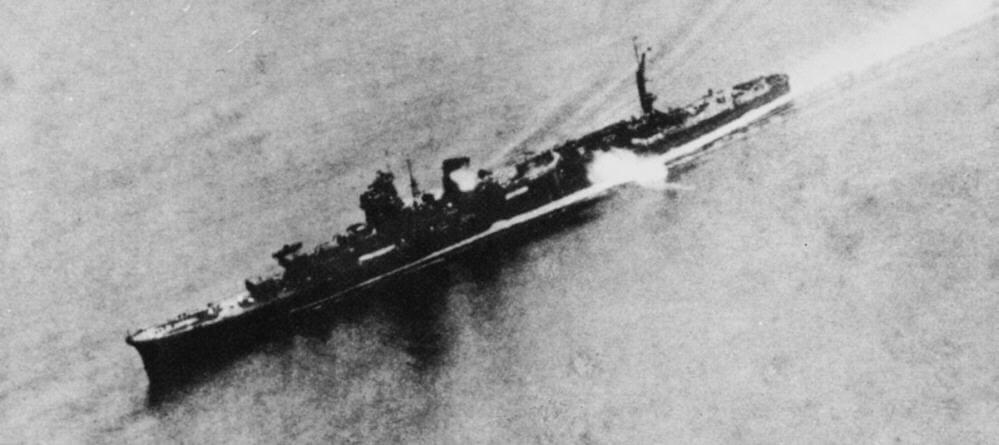
The light cruiser Noshiro under attack by US carrier aircraft, 26 October 1944

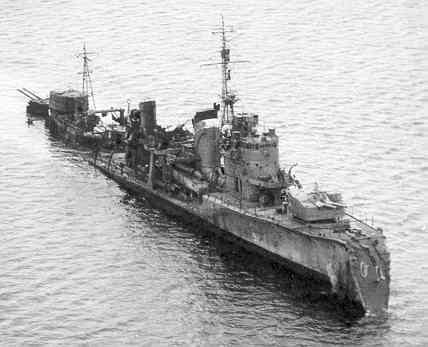
The beached wreck of the destroyer Hayashimo, 11 January 1945

Later that morning, two waves of carrier aircraft attacked the main fleet as it escaped through the San Bernardino straight, and Yamato, Nagato, and Kongō were all damaged by bomb hits and near misses. More decisively, planes from the aircraft carrier USS Wasp and the light carrier USS Cowpens ganged up on the light cruiser Noshiro and disabled her with at least one bomb and one torpedo hit between 8:34 to 8:52. The crippled Noshiro was assisted by the destroyers Hamanami and Akishimo which removed rear admiral Mikio Hayakawa, but at 10:20 a wave of aircraft from USS Hornet torpedoed Noshiro again and delivered the finishing blow. Noshiro sank by the bow with the loss of 83 men, including Captain Sueyoshi Kajiwara, while 628 survivors were rescued by Hamanami and Akishimo. Right afterwards, Hornet's torpedo bombers targeted the destroyer Hayashimo, caved in her bow, and cause her to run aground. Salvage operations immediately began on the crippled but not destroyed Hayashimo as the crew remained aboard for salvage operations, and the next day the destroyers Fujinami and Shiranui sailed to Hayashimo's position to free her and take her under tow. However, Fujinami was pounced on by a wave of dive bombers from USS Franklin before Shiranui was attacked by dive bombers from USS Enterprise, and both destroyers were sunk with all hands; including all the Chōkai survivors aboard Fujinami. Hayashimo herself was then bombed by aircraft from USS Essex which finally destroyed the vessel, resulting in the remaining crew abandoning the hulk and leaving it to the elements.

The battle took place in the very deep water above the Philippine Trench, with most sinkings in waters over 20,000 ft (6,000 m) deep. Wreckages that have been found include IJN Chōkai at nearly 17,000 ft (5,000 m),, USS Johnston at 21,180 ft (6,460 m), and as of June 2022, the deepest wreck ever surveyed at a depth of 23,000 ft (7,000 m), the USS Samuel B. Roberts.

== Criticism of Halsey ==
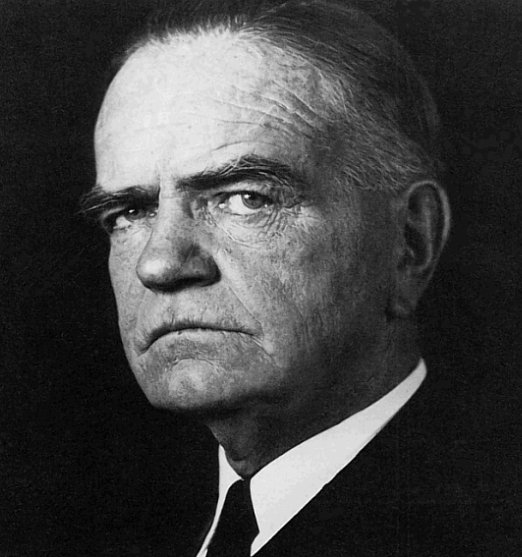
Admiral William F. "Bull" Halsey—Commander U.S. Third Fleet at Leyte Gulf

Halsey was criticized for his decision to take TF 34 north in pursuit of Ozawa and for failing to detach it when Kinkaid first appealed for help. A piece of U.S. Navy slang for Halsey's actions is "Bull's Run", a phrase combining Halsey's newspaper nickname "Bull" (in the U.S. Navy, the nickname "Bull" was used primarily by enlisted men, and Halsey's friends and fellow officers called him "Bill") with an allusion to the Battle of Bull Run in the American Civil War.

In his dispatch after the battle, Halsey gave reasons for his decision as follows:

Searches by my carrier planes revealed the presence of the Northern carrier force on the afternoon of October 24, which completed the picture of all enemy naval forces. As it seemed childish to me to guard statically San Bernardino Strait, I concentrated TF 38 during the night and steamed north to attack the Northern Force at dawn. I believed that the Center Force had been so heavily damaged in the Sibuyan Sea that it could no longer be considered a serious menace to Seventh Fleet.

Halsey also said that he had feared that leaving TF 34 to defend the strait without carrier support would have left it vulnerable to attack from land-based aircraft and leaving one of the fast carrier groups behind to cover the battleships would have significantly reduced the concentration of air power going north to strike Ozawa.

Morison writes in a footnote, "Admiral Lee, however, said after the battle that he would have been only too glad to have been ordered to cover San Bernardino Strait without air cover." If Halsey had been in proper communication with Seventh Fleet, the escort carriers of TF 77 could have provided adequate air cover for TF 34, a much easier matter than it would be for those escort carriers to defend themselves against the onslaught of Kurita's heavy ships.

It may be argued that the fact that Halsey was aboard one of the battleships and "would have had to remain behind" with TF 34 while the bulk of his fleet charged northwards to attack the Japanese carriers may have contributed to that decision. However, it would have been perfectly feasible and logical to have taken one or both of Third Fleet's two fastest battleships, Iowa and New Jersey, with the carriers in the pursuit of Ozawa, while leaving the rest of the Battle Line off San Bernardino Strait. (Indeed, Halsey's original plan for the composition of TF 34 was that it would contain only four, not all six, of the Third Fleet's battleships.) Therefore, to guard San Bernardino Strait with a powerful battleship force would have been compatible with Halsey's personally going north aboard the New Jersey.

It seems likely that Halsey was strongly influenced by his chief of staff, Rear Admiral Robert "Mick" Carney, who was also wholeheartedly in favor of taking all Third Fleet's available forces northwards to attack the Japanese carrier force.

Clifton Sprague, the commander of Task Unit 77.4.3 in the battle off Samar, was later bitterly critical of Halsey's decision and of his failure to inform Kinkaid and the Seventh Fleet clearly that their northern flank was no longer protected:

In the absence of any information that this exit [of the San Bernardino Strait] was no longer blocked, it was logical to assume that our northern flank could not be exposed without ample warning.

Regarding Halsey's failure to turn TF 34 southwards when Seventh Fleet's first calls for assistance off Samar were received, Morison writes:

If TF 34 had been detached a few hours earlier, after Kinkaid's first urgent request for help, and had left the destroyers behind, since their fueling caused a delay of over two hours and a half, a powerful battle line of six modern battleships under the command of Admiral Lee, the most experienced battle squadron commander in the Navy, would have arrived off San Bernardino Strait in time to have clashed with Kurita's Center Force. ... Apart from the accidents common in naval warfare, there is every reason to suppose that Lee would have crossed the T of Kurita's fleet and completed the destruction of Center Force.

Morison also observes, "The mighty gunfire of the Third Fleet's Battle Line, greater than that of the whole Japanese Navy, was never brought into action except to finish off one or two crippled light ships." (Note: In fact, Task Group 34.5 only finished off the straggling destroyer Nowaki. This was not achieved by the battleships, but rather by their escorting light cruisers and destroyers.) Perhaps the most telling comment was made laconically by Vice Admiral Willis Augustus Lee in his action report as the Commander of TF 34: "No battle damage was incurred, nor inflicted on the enemy by vessels while operating as Task Force Thirty-Four."

In his master's thesis submitted at the U.S. Army Command and General Staff College, Lieutenant Commander Kent Coleman argues that the division of command hierarchies of the Third Fleet, under Halsey reporting to Admiral Nimitz, and Seventh Fleet, under Vice Admiral Kinkaid reporting to General MacArthur, was the primary contributor to the near-success of Kurita's attack. Coleman concludes that "the divided U.S. naval chain of command amplified problems in communication and coordination between Halsey and Kinkaid. This divided command was more important in determining the course of the battle than the tactical decision made by Halsey and led to an American disunity of effort that nearly allowed Kurita's mission to succeed."

== Presidential Unit Citation ==
Taffy 3 was awarded a Presidential Unit Citation:

For extraordinary heroism in action against powerful units of the Japanese Fleet during the Battle off Samar, Philippines, October 25, 1944. ... the gallant ships of the Task Unit waged battle fiercely against the superior speed and fire power of the advancing enemy, ... two of the Unit's valiant destroyers and one destroyer escort charged the battleships point-blank and, expending their last torpedoes in desperate defense of the entire group, went down under the enemy's heavy shells as a climax to two and one half hours of sustained and furious combat. The courageous determination and the superb teamwork of the officers and men who fought the embarked planes and who manned the ships of Task Unit 77.4.3 were instrumental in effecting the retirement of a hostile force threatening our Leyte invasion operations and were in keeping with the highest traditions of the United States Naval Service.

== Legacy ==
A memorial to Sprague and Taffy 3 next to USS Midway (CV-41) in San Diego.

A number of ships were named after participants and ships from that battle, including USS Copeland (FFG-25), USS Evans (DE-1023), USS Clifton Sprague (FFG-16), USS Carr (FFG-52) and USS Hoel (DDG-13), and USS Johnston (DD-821). When USS Samuel B. Roberts (FFG-58) struck a mine in 1988, her crew touched a plaque commemorating the original crew as they struggled to save the ship.

While the battle is frequently included in historical accounts of the Battle of Leyte Gulf, the duels between the destroyer and destroyer escorts and Yamato and the Japanese force were the subject of a Dogfights television episode, "Death of the Japanese Navy". That episode, as well as a History Channel documentary, was based on The Last Stand of the Tin Can Sailors, written by James D. Hornfischer. The battle is also the subject of an episode of Ultimate Warfare on American Heroes Channel, "Courage at Sea".

== Works cited ==
- Cox, Robert Jon (2010). The Battle Off Samar: Taffy III at Leyte Gulf (5th ed.). Agogeebic Press. ISBN 978-0982239032.
- Hagen, Robert C. (May 26, 1945). "We Asked For the Jap Fleet—and Got It". The Saturday Evening Post. as told to Sidney Shalett. Saturday Evening Post Society. p. 9.
- Hornfischer, James D. (February 2004). The Last Stand of the Tin Can Sailors: The Extraordinary World War II Story of the U.S. Navy's Finest Hour. Bantam. ISBN 0-553-80257-7.
- Lundgren, Robert (October 23, 2014). The World Wonder'd: What really happened off Samar. Nimble Books. ISBN 978-1-608-88046-1.
- Kurita, Takeo (October 16–17, 1945). "Interrogations of Japanese Officials" (Interview). Vol. 1. Interviewed by Ofstie, R. A.; Field, J. A. Jr. U.S. Strategic Bombing Survey, U.S. Naval Analysis Division. Nav. No. 9; USSBS No. 47 – via Hyperwar Foundation.
- Morison, Samuel E. (1958). Leyte, June 1944 – January 1945. History of United States Naval Operations in World War II. Vol. XII. Boston: Little & Brown.
- Potter, E. B. (1985). "Last Years". Bull Halsey: A Biography. Annapolis, Maryland: Naval Institute Press. ISBN 0-87021-146-3.
- Roblin, Sebastien (June 2, 2019). "How 1 U.S. World War II Destroyer Charged a Japanese Armada of 4 Battleships". The National Interest.
- Thomas, Evan (2006). Sea of Thunder: Four Commanders and the Last Great Naval Campaign 1941–1945. Simon & Schuster. ISBN 0-7432-5221-7.
- Tully, Anthony P.; Wright, C.; Tamura, Toshio (2000). "Solving some Mysteries of Leyte Gulf: Fate of the "Chikuma" and "Chokai"". Warship International. 37 (3). International Naval Research Organization: 248–258. JSTOR 44895620.
