= USS Hoel (DD-533) =

Fletcher-class destroyer

Coordinates: 11°46′N 126°33′E

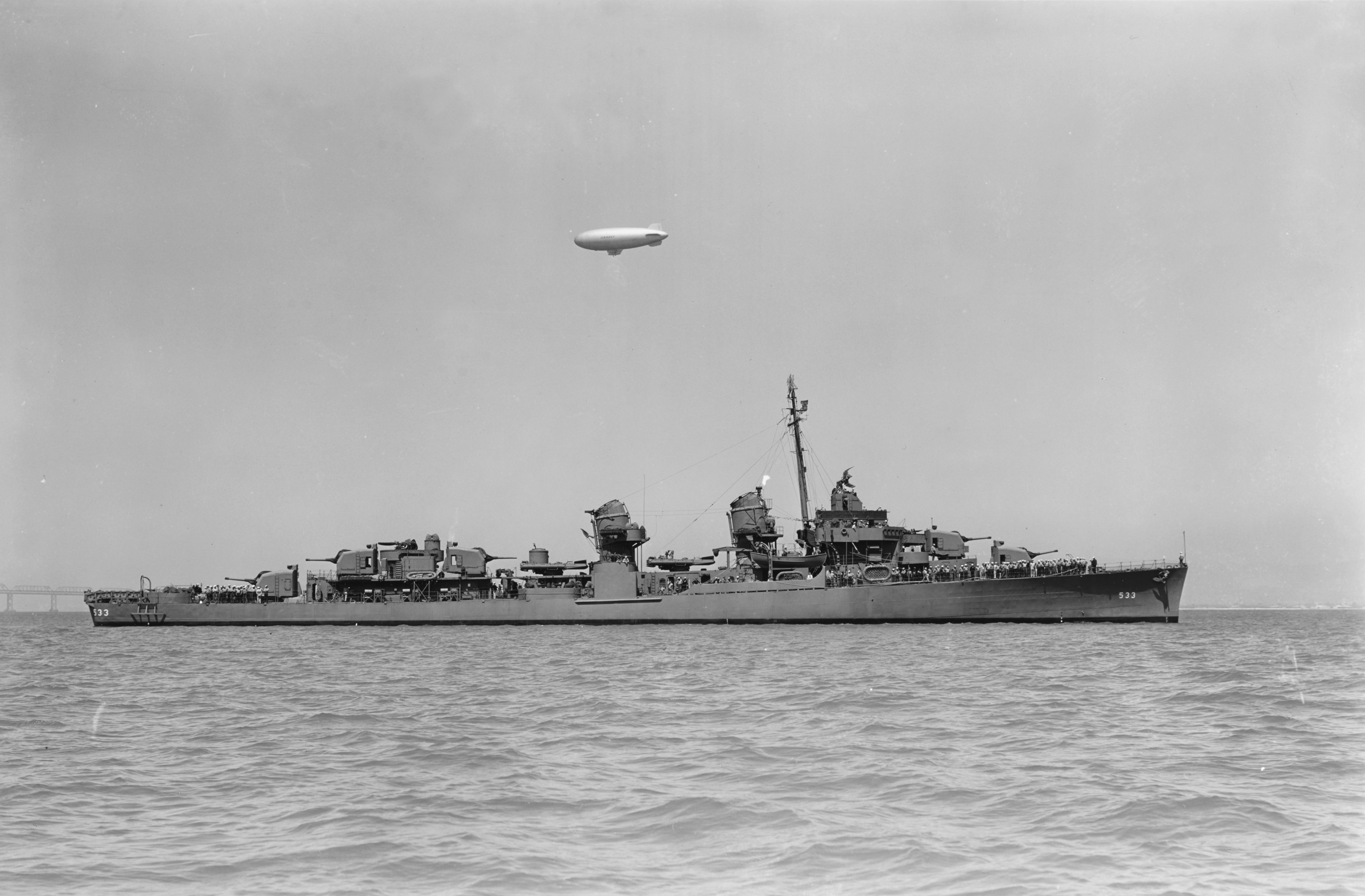
- Hoel anchored off San Francisco, 2 August 1943

History

United States
- Name: Hoel
- Namesake: William R. Hoel
- Builder: Bethlehem Shipbuilding Corporation, San Francisco, California
- Laid down: 4 June 1942
- Launched: 19 December 1942
- Commissioned: 19 July 1943
- Honours and awards: Presidential Unit Citation, Philippine Presidential Unit Citation, 5 Battle Stars
- Fate: Sunk by Japanese battleships Yamato and Nagato and heavy cruiser Haguro, 25 October 1944, Battle off Samar

General characteristics
- Class & type: Fletcher-class destroyer
- Displacement: 2,100 long tons (2,134 t) (Standard load); 2,544 long tons (2,585 t) (Full load)
- Length: 376 ft 6 in (114.76 m)
- Beam: 39 ft 8 in (12.1 m)
- Draft: 17 ft 9 in (5.4 m)
- Installed power: 60,000 shp (45,000 kW)
- Propulsion: 2 × geared steam turbines; 2 × shafts
- Speed: 38 knots (70 km/h; 44 mph)
- Range: 6,500 nmi (7,500 mi; 12,000 km) @ 15 kn (17 mph; 28 km/h)
- Complement: 273
- Sensors & processing systems: QC series sonar
- Armament: 5 × single Mk 12 5 in (127 mm)/38 guns; 5 × twin 40 mm (1.6 in) Bofors AA guns; 7 × single 20 mm (0.8 in) Oerlikon AA guns; 2 × quintuple 21 in (533 mm) torpedo tubes; 6 × single depth charge throwers; 2 × depth charge racks

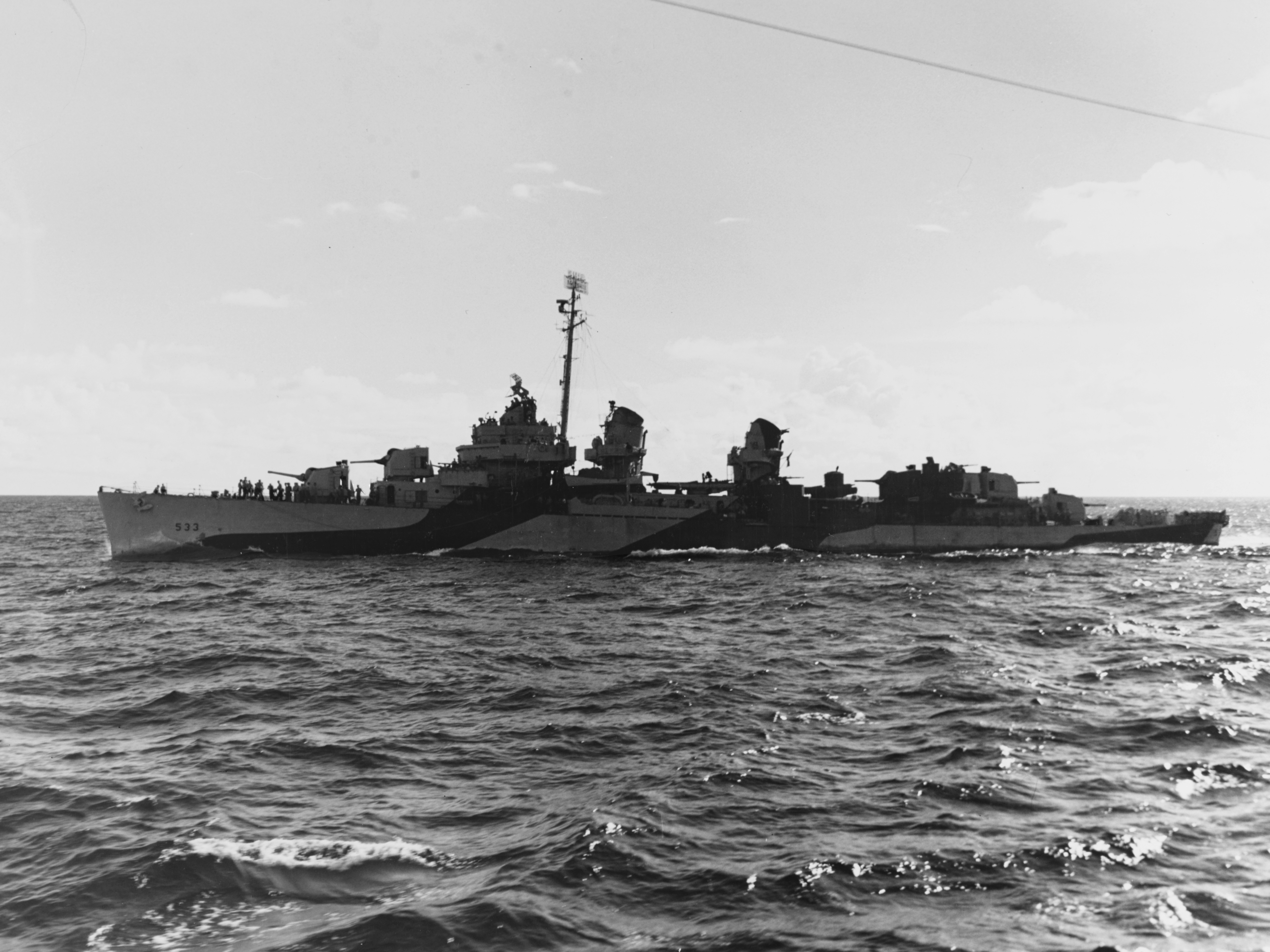
Hoel underway, 10 August 1944

USS Hoel (DD-533) was a Fletcher-class destroyer built for the United States Navy during World War II. She was named after Lieutenant Commander William R. Hoel. Commissioned in 1943, she is famous for helping to fend off a much larger Japanese center force at the Battle off Samar during the Battle of Leyte Gulf on 25 October 1944. She most notably assisted in forcing the battleship Yamato to retire from the battle with torpedo strikes. However, she did not live to tell the tale, first being crippled by gunfire from the battleship Nagato and the heavy cruiser Haguro, then finished off by Yamato's secondary armament. Hoel was awarded with the United States Presidential Unit Citation, Hoel received the Philippine Presidential Unit Citation and five battle stars for her service during the second world war.

== Design and characteristics ==
The Fletcher-class destroyers were designed, beginning in October 1939, to be large enough to adequately carry the armament of the preceding Gleaves-class destroyers. From January 1940 to the end of World War II, 175 Fletcher-class destroyers were built.

As a Fletcher-class, Hoel displaced 2,100 long tons (2,134 t) under her standard load and 2,544 long tons (2,585 t) at full load. She had an overall length of 376 feet 6 inches (114.76 m), with a draft of 13 feet 6 inches (4.11 m) and beam of 39 feet 4 inches (11.99 m). She was powered by two General Electric steam turbines and four Babcock & Wilcox boilers, which produced 60,000 shaft horsepower (45,000 kW) and a top speed of 38 knots (70 km/h; 44 mph). With a fuel capacity of 492 short tons (446 t) of fuel oil, Hoel had a range of 6,500 nautical miles (12,000 km; 7,500 mi) at 15 knots (28 km/h; 17 mph). She was crewed by 273 enlisted men and officers.

Hoel's armor measured 0.75 inches (19 mm) thick on its sides and 0.5 inches (13 mm) on the deck over its machinery. Her primary armament consisted of a main battery of five dual-purpose 5 in (127 mm)/38 cal. guns, guided by a Mark 37 Gun Fire Control System, ten 21 in (530 mm) torpedo tubes guided by a Mark 27 Torpedo Fire Control System, and six depth charge projectors with two tracks guided by a Mark 27 Depth Charge Fire Control System. Her anti-aircraft battery was made up by ten 40 mm (1.6 in) Bofors guns and seven 20 mm (0.79 in) Oerlikon cannons, each guided by a Mark 51 Fire Control System. She was equipped with a QC series sonar.

== Construction and service history ==
Hoel was launched on 19 December 1942 by the Bethlehem Steel Co., San Francisco, California, sponsored by Mrs. Charles Bunker Crane, Jr., granddaughter of the namesake; and commissioned on 29 July 1943.

Hoel sailed from San Francisco Bay 16 August 1943 for shakedown training in operating areas out of San Diego during which she made seven depth charge runs on an underwater sound contact with unknown results. After returning to Mare Island Naval Shipyard 17 September 1943 for final alterations, she cleared San Francisco 26 October 1943 as a part of the screen for a convoy which reached Pearl Harbor 31 October 1943 where Hoel reported to Captain Albert George (A. G.) Cook, Commander of Destroyer Squadron 47 (DesRon 47), who then shifted his flag to her from Heermann.

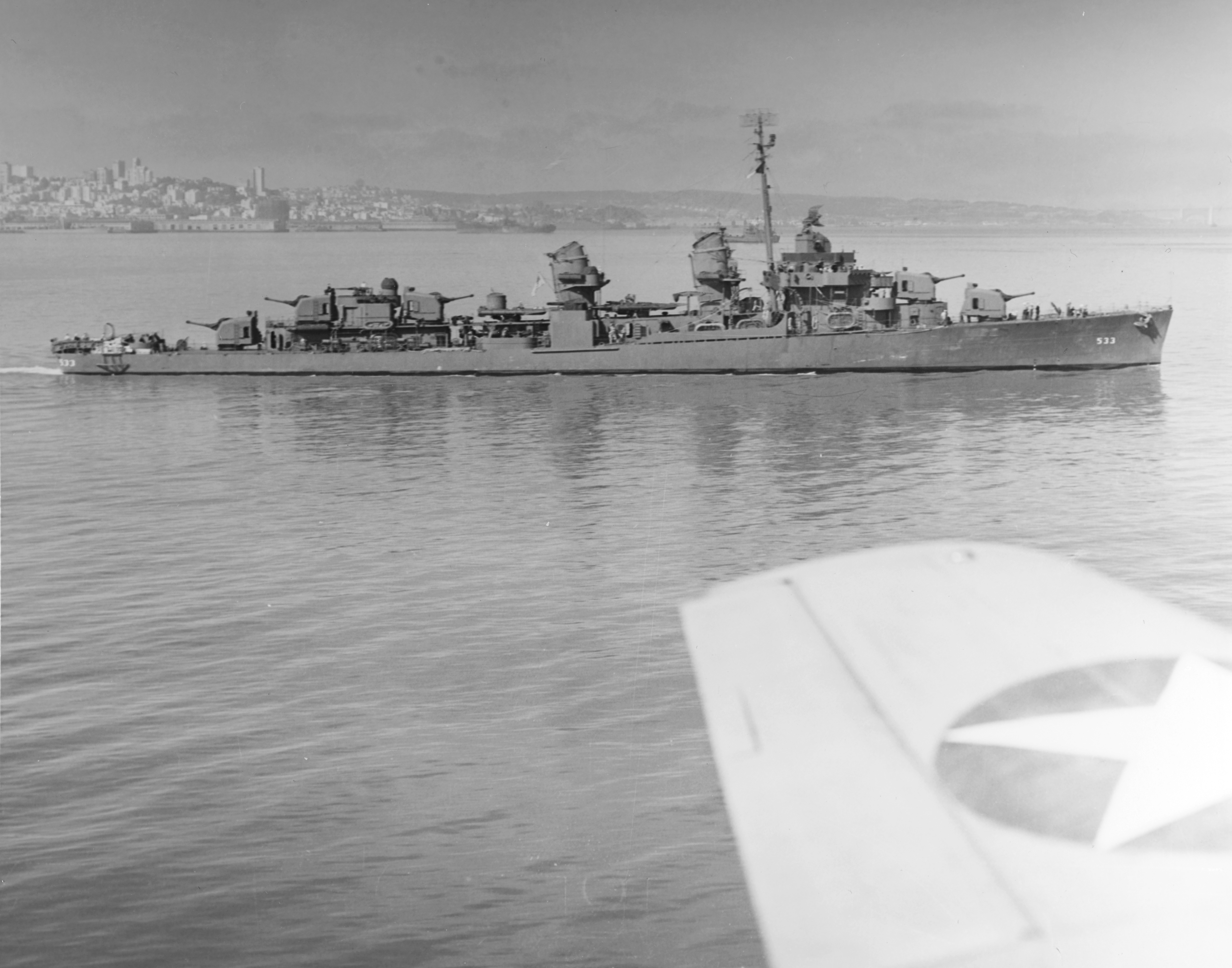
Hoel departing San Francisco on 7 August 1943

Fifth Fleet, which was then preparing to take the Gilbert Islands in Operation Galvanic, assigned Hoel to Rear Admiral Kelly Turner's Northern attack force Task Force 52 (TF 52). She joined Morris, Franks, and Hughes and Revenge in guarding Air Support Group 52.3 composed of the escort carriers Liscome Bay, Coral Sea, and Corregidor.

Hoel sortied from Pearl Harbor with her group 10 November 1943 and guarded her "baby flattops" as their aircraft pounded Makin in a dawn preinvasion attack 20 November 1943. For the next three days, torpedo bombers and fighters from Air Support Group 52.3 supported Major General Ralph C. Smith's 27th Infantry Division as it struggled to take Makin. Thousands of bombs and countless rounds from the guns on these aircraft smashed Japanese troop concentrations, gun emplacements, and shore installations on the island. Before dawn 24 November 1943, a torpedo fired by Japanese submarine I-175 struck Liscome Bay amidships and lookouts on the fantail of Coral Sea spotted the wake of a second torpedo which barely missed their ship. Bluejackets on board Hoel saw smoke and flame rise at least a 1,000 feet (300 m) when the torpedo ripped into Liscome Bay and detonated her bomb magazine. Rear Admiral Henry M. Mullinnix, commander of the Air Support Group, Captain Irving D. Wiltsie and 642 officers and men died with the carrier that sank some 23 minutes later after spewing smoke, flame and redhot aircraft parts for miles around. The groups destroyers rescued 272 survivors. At dusk the following day, 25 November 1943, Japanese aircraft spotted Rear Admiral Turner's task force steaming a few miles off Butaritari Island and dropped both float and parachute flares on each side of his ships to light them up as targets for 13 torpedo bombers which swooped in to attack. Spirited gunnery and well-timed radical simultaneous turns, however, enabled the American vessels to escape without suffering a single hit.

When the escort carriers cleared the area at night 27 November 1943, Hoel joined the screen protecting Abemama Group l which was unloading on Abemama Island. The next morning, Hoel joined Rear Admiral Turner's task force and arrived off Tarawa 1 December 1943 for antisubmarine patrol five miles (8 km) off the lagoon entrance. Two days later she joined the escort for Tennessee and a group of transports sailing for Pearl Harbor where they arrived 11 December 1943. Captain A. G. Cook, commander of Destroyer Squadron 47 shifted his flag from Hoel to McCord 14 December 1943.

Hoel with fleet units of the 5th Amphibious Force, began intensive training for the invasion of the Marshall Islands. Departed Pearl Harbor 21 January 1944 with the transport screen of Reserve Force, Task Group 51.1 (TG 51.1) which steamed east of Kwajalein while Rear Admiral Turner's Joint Expeditionary Force landed on that atoll 31 January 1944. Hoel escorted the group's transports into Kwajalein Lagoon 2 February 1944, and the following day took station as a radar picket patrol ship south of Kwajalein where she was on call for gunfire support. On 6 February 1944, she accompanied Miller on a tour of inspection in the Roi-Namur area for Admiral Chester Nimitz.

When Task Forces 51 and 53 dissolved and their ships reverted to Task Force 51, Hoel was assigned to Fire Support Section 3, Task Unit 51.17.3 (TU 51.17.3) of the Eniwetok Expeditionary Group. In the early morning darkness of 17 February 1944, Hoel reentered Eniwetok Lagoon with Portland to bombard Parry and Japtan Islands. Hoel picked up several aviators from a wrecked scout aircraft from Indianapolis and returned them to their ship. That afternoon Hoel's guns destroyed several small craft on the beach of Parry Island and fired on pillboxes and troop concentrations inland. She then anchored in standby position while the rest of the force bombarded the two islands. The next day, Hoel took her turn at providing harassing fire and at night illuminated the beaches and the reef to prevent enemy troop movements. Just before daybreak 19 February 1944, she took station off Eniwetok for close fire support of the initial landings. When relieved by Phelps on 21 February 1944, Hoel steamed to a position off the deep entrance to Eniwetok Lagoon for patrol duty which continued until 26 February 1944, when she embarked a fighter director team from Hazelwood and assumed duties of standby fighter director for the Eniwetok area. On 4 March 1944, 2 days later after the attack and occupation phase of Eniwetok was completed, the fighter-director team was transferred to Cambria, freeing Hoel to depart for Majuro for repairs. Hoel, in company with three other destroyers of DesRon 47 reported to Commander 3d Fleet at Purvis Bay, Florida Island, 18 March 1944. The next day she cleared that port to join Task Force 39, but 20 March 1944 she was ordered to change course for Emirau Island which was then being occupied by marines. On 25 March 1944, Trathen and Johnston joined Hoel and the rest of DesRon 47 uniting the squadron for the first time.

Hoel then patrolled south and east of Cape Botiangen, New Hanover Island, where her guns destroyed an enemy warehouse 26 March 1944, and, the next day, captured documents which contained valuable information from a 4-foot (1.2 m) outrigger canoe. That night she made four depth charge runs on an underwater sound contact with unknown results. She returned to Purvis Bay on 8 April 1944 to screen a convoy carrying troops and supplies to Emirau Island.

Upon her return to Purvis Bay 14 April 1944, Hoel reported for duty to Rear Admiral Robert W. Hayler, the commander of Cruiser Division 12 who kept her busy with training exercises and convoy duty until 14 August 1944, when she was assigned to the 3d Amphibious Force then preparing for the invasion of the Palaus. She joined Kitkun Bay at Espiritu Santo 24 August 1944, for passage to Purvis Bay. On 8 September 1944 they put to sea for the Palau Islands with Rear Admiral W. D. Sample's escort carrier task force unit to provide air support during the invasion of Peleliu. While continuing to screen the escort carriers, she rescued a pilot and passenger from an aircraft that had gone into the sea on attempting to take off from Ommaney Bay and transferred them to Marcus Island. On 1 October 1944, Hoel made three depth charge runs on an underwater sound contact with unknown results.

=== Taffy 3 ===
After replenishing at Seeadler Harbor of Manus, Admiralty Islands, Hoel cleared that base with a fire support group 12 October 1944 to join Rear Admiral Thomas L. Sprague's escort carrier group (Task Group 77.4) in invading the Philippines. Sprague's force was composed of three units, each comprising a group of escort carriers and a screen of destroyers and destroyer escorts. These units, known by their radio calls as the "Three Taffys", began operating off Samar 18 October 1944 to cover the landings on Leyte. Hoel was attached to "Taffy 3" (Escort Carrier Task Unit 77.4.3) commanded by Rear Admiral Clifton A. F. Sprague and comprising four escort carriers guarded by destroyers Hoel, Heermann, and Johnston. Before the Battle off Samar, "Taffy 3" was reinforced by the arrival of Admiral Ralph A. Ofstie with two more escort carriers and Dennis, John C. Butler, Raymond, and Samuel B. Roberts.

=== Battle off Samar ===
Dawn of 25 October 1944 found "Taffy 3" steaming northeast of Samar operating as the Northern Air Support Group. "Taffy 2" was in the central position patrolling off the entrance to Leyte Gulf, and "Taffy 1" covered the southern approaches to the Gulf some 150 miles (240 km) to the southeast of Hoel's "Taffy 3". Rear Admiral Clifton A. F. Sprague was under the erroneous impression that Admiral William Halsey's 3d Fleet was providing protection to the north and so was taken by surprise when at 06:45 "Taffy 3"'s lookouts observed anti-aircraft fire to the northward and within three minutes were under heavy fire from Vice Admiral Takeo Kurita's powerful Center Force of 4 battleships, 6 heavy cruisers, 2 light cruisers, and 11 destroyers.

==== Initial charge and damage ====
The only chance for survival of the little group of American "Jeep" carriers and "tin cans" lay in running to the east long enough to launch what aircraft could be readied before fleeing to the south hoping that aid would arrive before their complete destruction. While the carriers launched all available aircraft to attack their numerous Japanese adversaries and then formed a rough circle as they turned toward Leyte Gulf, Hoel and her fellow destroyers Johnston and Heermann, worked feverishly to lay down a smoke screen to hide their "baby flattops" from the overwhelmingly superior enemy ships. At 07:06, when a providential rain squall helped to hide his carriers, Admiral Clifton Sprague boldly ordered his destroyers to attack the Japanese with torpedoes. Hoel instantly obeyed this order by heading straight for the nearest enemy battleship, Kongō, then 18,000 yards (16,000 m) away. When she had closed to 14,000 yards (13,000 m) she opened fire as she continued her race toward Kongō. Kongō in turn failed to spot Hoel, as she was blinded by a rain squall.

However, at 10,300 yards, the Japanese heavy cruiser Haguro spotted a US "cruiser" attempting a torpedo charge and fired a full broadside of ten 8-inch (203 mm) guns. Haguro's target was none other than Hoel, which she mistook for a cruiser due to the poor weather and reports that Kurita's fleet was facing American fleet carriers. Raining fire, Hoel was immediately hit on the first salvo as two 8-inch (203 mm) shells from Haguro sliced through her bridge and main battery director, disabling her FD radar, PPI scope, machine gun control, and radio communications. On her second salvo, Haguro hit Hoel with another 8-inch (203 mm) shell which hit above her number 1 fire room, but inflicted no significant damage as Hoel charged on. Had these shells exploded, Hoel would have been significantly more damaged, but Haguro mistook her for a cruiser and fired AP shells that overpenetrated her unarmored hull without exploding.

In response, Hoel fired five torpedoes at Kongō, but right afterwards she was hit simultaneously by three more 8-inch (203 mm) shells from Haguro, the first two hit below the waterline and cut through her engine room and fire room, while the third started a fire in the handing room for her number 3 5-inch (127 mm) turret, the fire was extinguished in 3 minutes, but it still took the turret out of action. Had this shell exploded, it likely would have detonated Hoel's magazines. The port engine and after generator were also destroyed, dropping her speed by 4.5 knots. On her fourth salvo, Haguro hit Hoel with three more 8-inch (203 mm) shells, one each hit and destroyed her turrets 4 and 5, while the third hit the stern and destroyed two 20 mm AA guns. Finally, a 5-inch (127 mm) shell from Haguro's secondary battery exploded in her bow and caused minor flooding.

A total of nine 8-inch (203 mm) shells and one 5-inch (127 mm) shell destroyed three of Hoel's five 5-inch (127 mm) gun, her port engine, after generator, bridge, and main battery director. Making things worse, Kongō spotted four of Hoel's five torpedoes, but they were too far off to affect the ship as she continued in a straight line. US sources often state Kongō was forced to evade those torpedoes in a hard turn, losing track of the escort carriers, but Kongo's own records do not support this. Some historians wrote of a 14-inch (356 mm) shell destroying Hoel's bridge, but her own records also fail to back up that claim.

==== Torpedo attack on Yamato ====
Horrifically scorched but not fully sunk, Hoel fired up a smokescreen and headed Southeast, regrouping with Heermann. At 7:50, the pair spotted what they believed to be a Japanese cruiser squadron led by Haguro. However, Hoel's target was actually the Haruna followed by the other Japanese battleships, including Admiral Kurita's flagship, the Yamato. Hoel engaged in a gun duel with the largest and most powerful battleship ever made, firing 250 rounds from her two remaining 5-inch (127 mm) guns over the course of several minutes while Yamato responded with her own battery of 5-inch (127 mm) dual purposed guns, Hoel was successfully undamaged, and despite her shredded fire control managed to hit Yamato with a pair of 5-inch (127 mm) shells that exploded inside one of her kitchens. As Hoel turned away, she fired her remaining five torpedoes at 8:53 which ran "hot, straight and normal." This time her crew was rewarded by the sight of large columns of water alongside their target, seemingly signifying hits. This observation may have been illusory, as neither Haruna nor Haguro received torpedo damage and explosions may have been near miss bombs from the constant air attacks. They missed their intended target, Haruna, but swam straight into the direction of Yamato and Nagato. A few minutes later, Heermann fired two torpedoes at the same target, and both Japanese battleships were caught in between both spreads and forced out of the battle for an extended period of time, causing Admiral Kurita to lose control over the battlefield.

However, Hoel did not escape without damage, before turning away Nagato engaged a US "cruiser" and fired off her main and secondary battery. One of Nagato's 5.5-inch (14 cm) shells destroyed Hoel's forward engine and generator rooms, causing her to lose speed. Several more hit the ship's superstructure and set her on fire, while one of Nagato's 16.1-inch (41 cm) shells smashed through Hoel's bow. The damage caused Hoel to further list 10 degrees to port.

==== Final moments ====
Out of torpedoes, Hoel limped to the escort carriers. Despite the horrific damage inflicted by Haguro and Nagato, Hoel still attempted to cover the escort carrier USS Gambier Bay from attacking Japanese ships. At this point, Yamato had returned to the battle and was shredding Gambier Bay with long range gunfire, but at 8:34 she noticed the crippled Hoel at 9,000 yards and pounced on the destroyer with her secondary battery. Hoel responded with her forward guns, but 6.1-inch (155 mm) gunfire got the better of her as a hit destroyed her last boiler, leaving Hoel dead in the water. The disabled destroyer quickly became an easy target as Yamato began to hit Hoel more frequently, she was set ablaze and set her forward magazines on fire as practically every function on the ship was disabled. After sustaining over 40 shell hits, at 8:40 Hoel listed at 20 degrees as the crew abandoned ship and left her to sink. The destroyer Isokaze inspected the sinking Hoel. Her crew wished to machine gun survivors as revenge for US pilots strafing Japanese survivors in the water. Captain Maeda, while half considering it, gave in to his conscience and ordered off an attack. Still, Isokaze sailed off without rescuing survivors as Hoel finally rolled over and sank at 8:55.

Only 86 of Hoel's complement survived; 253 officers and men died with their ship, at least 40 of them dying in the water while awaiting rescue. Commander Kintberger described the courageous devotion to duty of the men of the Hoel in a seaman's epitaph to the action: "Fully cognizant of the inevitable result of engaging such vastly superior forces, these men performed their assigned duties coolly and efficiently until their ship was shot from under them." As they waited for rescue, the surviving crew watched a close up view of Yamato sailing right past them, which they described as “a ship so huge it takes your breath away.”. Nearly 48 hours after the destroyer’s demise, the American transport ships LCI-341 and LCI-337 each rescued Hoel's survivors and brought them to Leyte Gulf for medical treatment and transfer back to the United States.

== Awards and Memorials ==
In addition to the United States Presidential Unit Citation, Hoel received the Philippine Presidential Unit Citation and five battle stars for World War II service.

The William E. Taylor Division of the US Naval Sea Cadet Corps is named after Watertender 2nd Class William E. Taylor, a native of Wilmington, Delaware, who died on the USS Hoel. The division is based out of Kennett Square, Pennsylvania.

== Notes ==
=== References ===
- Harry, Stephanie. "Hoel I (DD-533)". Dictionary of American Naval Fighting Ships. Navy Department, Naval History and Heritage Command.

==== Books ====
- Friedman, Norman (1982). U.S. Destroyers: An Illustrated Design History. Naval Institute Press. ISBN 9780870217333.
- Gardiner, Robert; Chesneau, Roger, eds. (1980). Conway's All the World's Fighting Ships 1922–1946. Naval Institute Press. ISBN 9780870219139.
- Hornfischer, James D. (2004). The Last Stand of the Tin Can Sailors. Bantam Books. ISBN 9780553802573.
- McComb, Dave (2010). US Destroyers 1942–45: Wartime Classes. Osprey Publishing. ISBN 9781846034442.
