= TCG Gaziantep =

TCG Gaziantep is the name of the following ships of the Turkish Navy, named for the city of Gaziantep:

- TCG Gaziantep (D 344), ex-USS Lansdowne (DD-486), a Gleaves-class destroyer acquired in 1949 and scrapped in 1973
- TCG Gaziantep (F 490), ex-USS Clifton Sprague (FFG-16), a Oliver Hazard Perry-class frigate acquired in 1997, in active service
