= Clifton Sprague =

United States Navy admiral (1896–1955)

Clifton A. F. Sprague
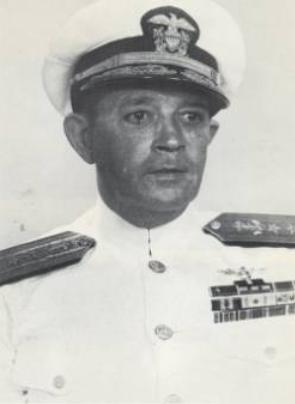
- Born: January 8, 1896; Dorchester, Boston, Massachusetts, U.S.
- Died: April 11, 1955 (aged 59); San Diego, California, U.S.
- Burial place: Fort Rosecrans National Cemetery
- Military career
- Allegiance: United States of America
- Branch: United States Navy
- Service years: 1914–1951
- Rank: Vice admiral
- Nickname: Ziggy
- Commands: Aircraft Squadron 3 USS Patoka (AO-9); USS Tangier (AV-8); USS Wasp (CV-18); Carrier Division 25; Carrier Division 26; Carrier Division 2 Navy Air Group 1.6; Carrier Division 6
- Conflicts: World War I World War II
- Awards: Navy Cross; Legion of Merit (4)

Clifton Albert Frederick Sprague (January 8, 1896 – April 11, 1955) was a World War II–era officer in the United States Navy.

== Biography ==
Sprague was born in Dorchester, Massachusetts, and attended the Roxbury Latin School. He entered the United States Naval Academy in 1914. There he was given the nickname "Ziggy". Due to the American involvement in World War I he graduated and received his commission as an ensign one year early, on June 28, 1917, finishing forty-third out of 199. His wife was the sister of The Great Gatsby author F. Scott Fitzgerald.

Admiral Clifton "Ziggy" Sprague was no relation to his Naval Academy classmate Admiral Thomas L. "Tommy" Sprague. Both Admirals Sprague were commanders in the Battle of Leyte Gulf.

== World War I ==
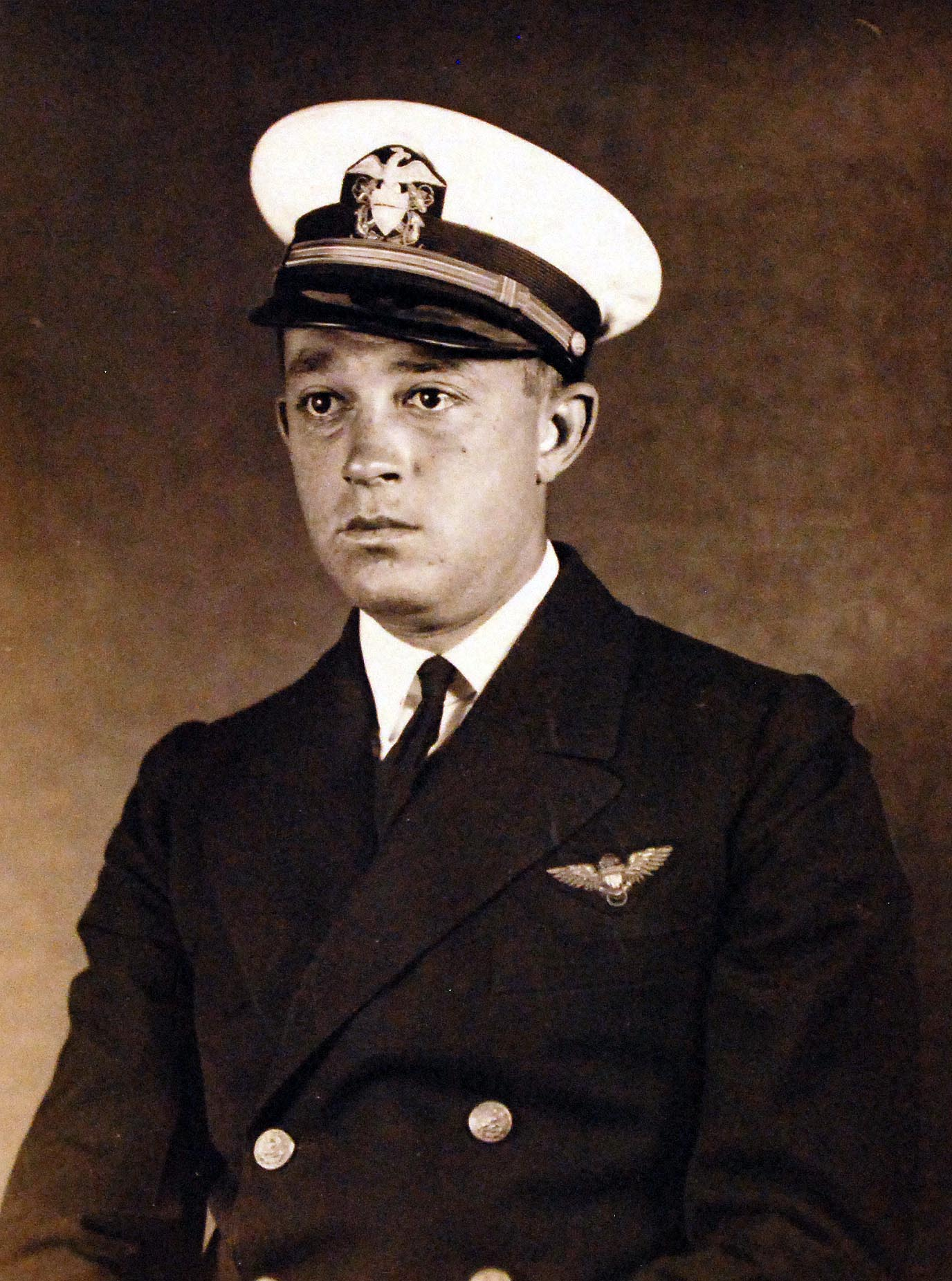
Sprague as Lieutenant, USN in 1923.

His first assignment was on the gunboat Wheeling (PG-14), where he served as gunnery officer, communications officer, navigator, and executive officer. Wheeling served as a convoy escort in the Atlantic and Mediterranean during the war. While assigned to Wheeling he was promoted to lieutenant (junior grade) and lieutenant. After the war in October 1919, Sprague was assigned as the reserve commanding officer of the destroyer Manley (DD-74) for two months. Thereafter he was assigned to the new battleship Tennessee (BB-43) and served as 6th broadside battery officer for one year.

== 1920 to 1940 – Naval Aviator ==
On December 3, 1920, Sprague joined 33 other classmates at Naval Air Station Pensacola, Florida, as a student pilot. His first flight was on January 11, 1921, when he piloted a Curtiss N-9 aircraft for twenty minutes. Sprague earned the designation Naval Aviator No. 2934 on August 11, 1921. Due to his great proficiency, within two months he was designated as commanding officer of Aircraft Squadron 3 at Pensacola.

From March 1922 to November 1923, Sprague was assigned to Aircraft Squadron VS-1 with the Atlantic Fleet based on the seaplane tender Wright. He reported to his next duty station Naval Air Station Anacostia, near Washington, D.C., in November 1923, where he served as a test pilot, operations officer, and executive officer. As a test pilot he conducted experimental and research work at the Naval Aircraft Factory in Philadelphia, Pennsylvania, in 1923, where he contributed to the development of aircraft carrier catapult systems. From March 1926 to February 1928 he assisted inventor Carl Norden in the laboratory and as a test pilot at Naval Air Station Hampton Roads, Virginia, resulting in improvements to the Mark 1 carrier arresting gear system for Lexington (CV-2) and Saratoga (CV-3).

Sprague reported to Lexington in March 1928, where he assumed the duties of flight deck officer and assistant air officer. In January 1929 Lexington along with Langley and Saratoga participated in Fleet Problem IX, a simulated aerial attack on the Panama Canal. Sprague's tour on Lexington ended in April 1929. Returning to the U.S. Naval Academy in May 1929, Sprague served as executive officer of VN-8-D5. On June 10, 1930, he was promoted to lieutenant commander. His tour at the Naval Academy ended in November 1931.

Sprague served as squadron commander of VP-8 in Panama in December 1931 to April 1934. The squadron was based on the seaplane tender Wright (AV-1) homeported at the Norfolk Navy Yard. In 1933 the squadron was moved to Hawaii, where Sprague became the first navy pilot to fly a thirteen-hour round-trip from Hawaii to Midway Island in February 1934. From May 1934 to July 1936, Sprague served as air operations officer at Naval Air Station Norfolk, Virginia, where his department serviced several aircraft carrier squadrons.

In July 1936, Sprague was assigned to the newly constructed aircraft carrier Yorktown (CV-5) as air officer. After her commissioning, he piloted the first two landings ever made on Yorktown. In addition, he was the first pilot to test the catapult system on Yorktown. Sprague was promoted to commander in December 1937. He spent all of 1938 managing the Air Department and aircraft squadrons on Yorktown. In February 1939 Yorktown participated in Fleet Problem XX in the Caribbean. Shortly thereafter, Sprague left the carrier in June 1939. Sprague was ordered to the Naval War College in Newport, Rhode Island, in June 1939, where he spent three months in study before reporting to his first sea command, the 21-year-old oil tanker Patoka (AO-9) at Puget Sound Naval Shipyard, Bremerton, Washington. Sprague commanded Patoka until June 1940, when he was sent back to the Naval War College for two more months of study.

== World War II ==
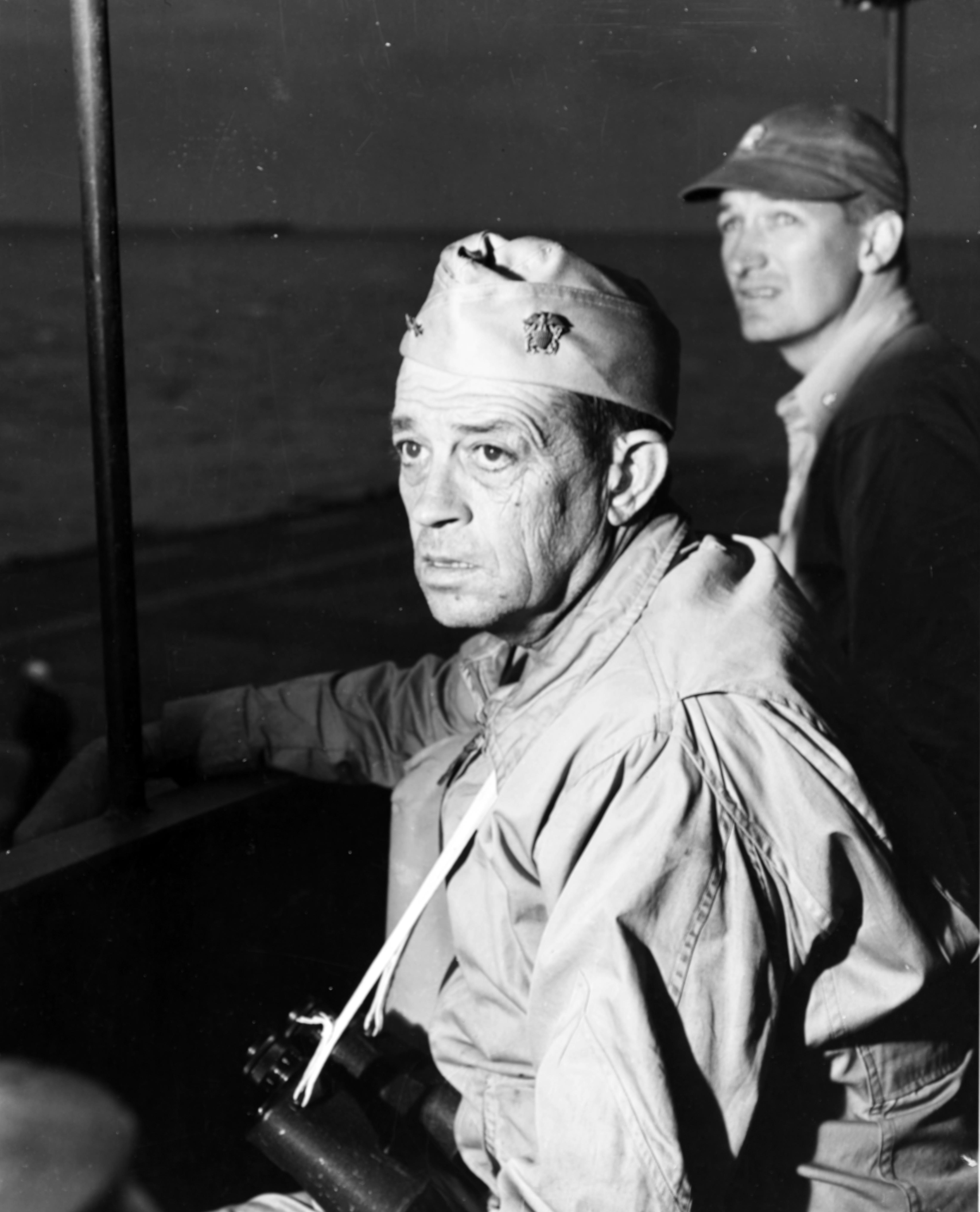
Sprague onboard USS Fanshaw Bay (CVE-70), off Okinawa, Japan, April 1945

At Oakland, California, Sprague took command of the cargo ship Tangier (AV-8), which was being converted into a seaplane tender in July 1940. Tangier was commissioned on August 25, 1941, and shortly thereafter transited to Bremerton, Washington, to load torpedoes. At her homeport in Pearl Harbor, Hawaii, Tangier was mated with Fleet Patrol Wing Two. Tangier was berthed at F-10 on the northwest side of Ford Island on the morning of December 7, 1941. She was one of the first ships in the harbor to open fire and engaged several Japanese aircraft throughout the morning. Tangier was credited with downing three aircraft. As a result of his leadership at Pearl Harbor, Sprague was promoted to captain on January 3, 1942. In early 1942 Tangier saw service at New Caledonia.

Sprague was assigned as air officer of Gulf Sea Frontier, Miami, Florida, in June 1942. His duties involved improving defenses, keeping the sea lanes open, and countering the German U-boats on the Southeast coast of the United States. Upon achieving his goals he was transferred in March 1943. In April 1943, Sprague was transferred to Naval Air Center, Seattle, Washington, where he served as commander of the base and nearby Naval Air Station Sand Point. This duty ended abruptly when he was assigned as the commanding officer of the newly constructed fast fleet carrier Wasp (CV-18) in October 1943.

Arriving at Bethlehem Steel's Fore River Yard near Boston, Massachusetts, Sprague took command of Wasp where she was commissioned on November 24, 1943. The carrier was quickly sent to the Pacific, where she joined the war against the Japanese. Her first combat missions were to destroy enemy aircraft, installations, and surface craft on Marcus and Wake Islands in May 1944. In June 1944 Wasp participated in the invasion of Saipan and the Battle of the Philippine Sea. On July 9, 1944, shortly before leaving Wasp, Sprague was promoted to rear admiral at age 48.

Sprague was designated as commander of Carrier Division 25 on July 23, 1944, with his flag in Fanshaw Bay (CVE-70), replacing Rear Admiral Gerald F. Bogan. In September 1944 his task unit supported the Morotai landing.

Sprague's greatest achievement came on October 25, 1944, when his Task Unit 77.4.3 (radio call sign Taffy III) consisting of 6 escort carriers, 3 destroyers, and 4 destroyer escorts fought off the 4 battleships, 6 heavy cruisers, 2 light cruisers, and 11 destroyers of Japanese Admiral Takeo Kurita's vastly superior Center Force at the Battle off Samar near Samar Island in the Philippines. Taken by surprise by Kurita's larger, faster ships, Sprague coolly maneuvered his force to take maximum advantage of the wind and weather while his pilots bombed and strafed the attacking ships, even making dry runs after their ammunition ran out. He ordered his escorts to lay smoke to cover the carriers, then ordered them to counterattack with torpedoes, culminating in toe-to-toe gun duels between Taffy III's destroyers and destroyer escorts and Center Force's battleships and cruisers. Taffy III was mauled by Center Force, with four ships sunk and most of the others damaged, but Sprague succeeded in turning Kurita back, preventing him from reaching his intended target—the vulnerable invasion shipping off Leyte Island—and sinking three of Center Force's heavy cruisers. Sprague was awarded the Navy Cross for the leadership he displayed off Samar.

On February 19, 1945, Sprague assumed command of Carrier Division 26 embarked on Natoma Bay (CVE-62) for the invasion of Iwo Jima where his unit provided close air support for the Marines ashore. The next month he moved his flag back to Fanshaw Bay for the invasion of Okinawa. In April 1945, Sprague was given command of Carrier Division 2, a fast carrier Task Group and moved his flag to Ticonderoga (CV-14) on June 1, 1945. His task group operated against the Japanese home islands of Kyūshū, Honshū, and Hokkaidō. Sprague received the notification of the end of hostilities while steaming 151 miles off the eastern coast of Honshū on August 15, 1945. Four days after the Japanese surrender, Sprague and Ticonderoga entered Tokyo Bay.

== Post War – Operation Crossroads and final duties ==
Memorial to Sprague next to the USS Midway in San Diego.

Sprague returned to the West Coast on board Bennington (CV-20) in November 1945. He spent the next month in Washington, D.C., briefing naval leaders at the White House. In February 1946, Sprague was given command of Navy Air Group 1.6 of Joint Task Force 1 with his flag in Shangri-La (CV-38) at San Diego, California. During the next six months he supported the naval aviation forces in the Operation Crossroads nuclear tests on Bikini Atoll in the Marshall Islands.

At Corpus Christi, Texas, Sprague was assigned as Chief of Naval Air Basic Training in August 1946. In January 1948 he was redesignated as commander, Naval Air Advanced Training. His tour ended in April 1948. Sprague's last seagoing command was as commander, Carrier Division Six with his flag in Kearsarge (CV-33) from May to October 1948. During this tour Kearsarge operated in the Mediterranean. On January 1, 1949, to February 1950, Sprague was commander of Naval Air Bases, Eleventh and Twelfth Naval District at Naval Air Station Coronado in San Diego, California. Reassigned in March 1950, Sprague was moved to Alaska, where he served as commandant of Seventeenth Naval District and commander of Alaskan Sea Frontier on Kodiak Island. It was from here that he embarked on a Boeing B-29 Superfortress and became the first U.S. Navy admiral to fly over the North Pole, on November 12, 1950.

== Retirement and death ==
On August 9, 1951, Sprague requested voluntary retirement from the Navy and was officially retired on November 1, 1951. As was custom at the time, he was advanced to vice admiral at retirement in recognition of his Navy Cross. He had spent 34 years, 4 months, and 4 days on active duty. In March 1955, Sprague fell ill of a weak heart and was moved to the Naval Hospital, San Diego, California. On April 11, 1955, 59-year-old Sprague died from a massive heart attack. Two days later he was buried at Fort Rosecrans National Cemetery at Point Loma, San Diego, California.

== Decorations ==
Here is the ribbon bar of Vice Admiral Clifton Sprague:

Naval Aviator Badge
1st Row	Navy Cross		Legion of Merit with "V" Device and three Gold Stars
2nd Row	Navy Presidential Unit Citation with two stars	Navy Unit Citation	World War I Victory Medal with Escort Clasp
3rd Row	American Defense Service Medal with Fleet Clasp	Asiatic-Pacific Campaign Medal with eight Service stars	American Campaign Medal
4th Row	World War II Victory Medal	National Defense Service Medal	Philippine Liberation Medal with two service stars

== Namesake ==
The Oliver Hazard Perry-class guided-missile frigate USS Clifton Sprague (FFG-16) was named after Vice Admiral Sprague. The unclassified citation for the Navy Cross was displayed in the wardroom until shortly before decommissioning.

== Books ==
- Hornfischer, James D. (2004). The Last Stand of the Tin Can Sailors. New York: Bantam Books. ISBN 978-0-553-80257-3. OCLC 53019787.
- Morison, Samuel E. (2001) [1958]. Leyte, June 1944 - January 1945, Volume XII. History of United States Naval Operations in World War II. Edison, New Jersey: Castle Books. ISBN 0-7858-1313-6. OCLC 52204538.
- Thomas, Evan, (2007), Sea of Thunder: Four Naval Commanders and the Last Sea War, New York: Simon and Schuster, ISBN 9780743252225 .
- Wukovits, John F. (1995). Devotion to Duty: A Biography of Admiral Clifton A. F. Sprague. Annapolis, Maryland: Naval Institute Press. ISBN 1-55750-944-1. OCLC 32273984.
- Y'Blood, William T. (1987). The Little Giants: U.S. Escort Carriers Against Japan. Annapolis, Maryland: Naval Institute Press. ISBN 0-87021-275-3. OCLC 15489283.
