= The Last Stand of the Tin Can Sailors =

2004 book by James D. Hornfischer

- Author: James D. Hornfischer
- Language: English
- Subject: Military history, World War II
- Publisher: Bantam Books
- Publication date: February 3, 2004
- Media type: Print (Hardcover & Paperback)
- Pages: 512
- ISBN: 978-0-553-80257-3 (hc)
- OCLC: 53019787
- Dewey Decimal: 940.54/25995 22
- LC Class: D774.L48 H67 2004

The nonfiction book The Last Stand of the Tin Can Sailors: The Extraordinary World War II Story of the U.S. Navy's Finest Hour is a narrative account of the Battle off Samar, an event which the book's author, James D. Hornfischer, calls the greatest upset in the history of naval warfare. Published by Bantam Books in February 2004, the book won the Samuel Eliot Morison Award for Naval Literature in 2004 from the Naval Order of the United States.

== Content ==
The Last Stand of the Tin Can Sailors tells the story of the remarkable two-and-a-half-hour sea battle fought on October 25, 1944, in which Rear Admiral Clifton A. F. Sprague's task unit, known as "Taffy 3" (7th Fleet's Task Unit 77.4.3), of escort carriers and their "tin can" destroyers and destroyer escorts rose to the impossible challenge of beating back an overwhelming force of Japanese battleships and cruisers under Vice Admiral Takeo Kurita. Survivors of the four U.S. ships lost in the battle, USS Hoel (DD-533), USS Johnston (DD-557), USS Samuel B. Roberts (DE-413), and USS Gambier Bay (CVE-73)- then faced a two-day-ordeal adrift at sea awaiting rescue.

Task Group 77.4 is also notable for its association with the first successful preplanned Kamikaze attacks conducted by the recently established Japanese Special Attack Units launched their first successful preplanned and intentional suicide Kamikaze attacks. U.S. 7th Fleet's Task Unit 77.4.1, Call Sign "Taffy 1", was attacked at 07:40 that morning with impacts and damage to two vessels. The Japanese fleet had withdrawn at 09:30, but Taffy 3 was then attacked again, by Kamikaze aircraft, less than two hours later at 10:50. A fifth ship from Taffy 3, the escort carrier USS St. Lo (CVE-63), was sunk when it was struck by a single A6M Zero carrying a 500 lb bomb.

The book was a Main Selection of the Book-of-the-Month Club and the Military Book Club.

== Documentaries ==
Two TV documentaries based on Hornfischer's book have been produced. The first of them, produced by Lou Reda Productions and premiering on The History Channel on November 11, 2005, featured interviews with Hornfischer and veterans of the battle. It was followed by an episode of Dogfights on the History Channel, titled "The Death of the Japanese Navy", premiering on December 29, 2006, which featured a CGI rendition of the sea battle.

== Graphic novel ==
In 2021, Doug Murray and Steve Sanders, with Hornfischer, adapted the book into a graphic novel of the same name.

== See also ==
- Lt. Commander Robert W. Copeland, commanding officer of USS Samuel B. Roberts (DE-413)
- USS Heermann (DD-532)
- Commander Ernest E. Evans, commanding officer of USS Johnston (DD-557)
- USS Hoel (DD-533)
