= Japanese cruiser Haguro =

Myōkō-class heavy cruiser

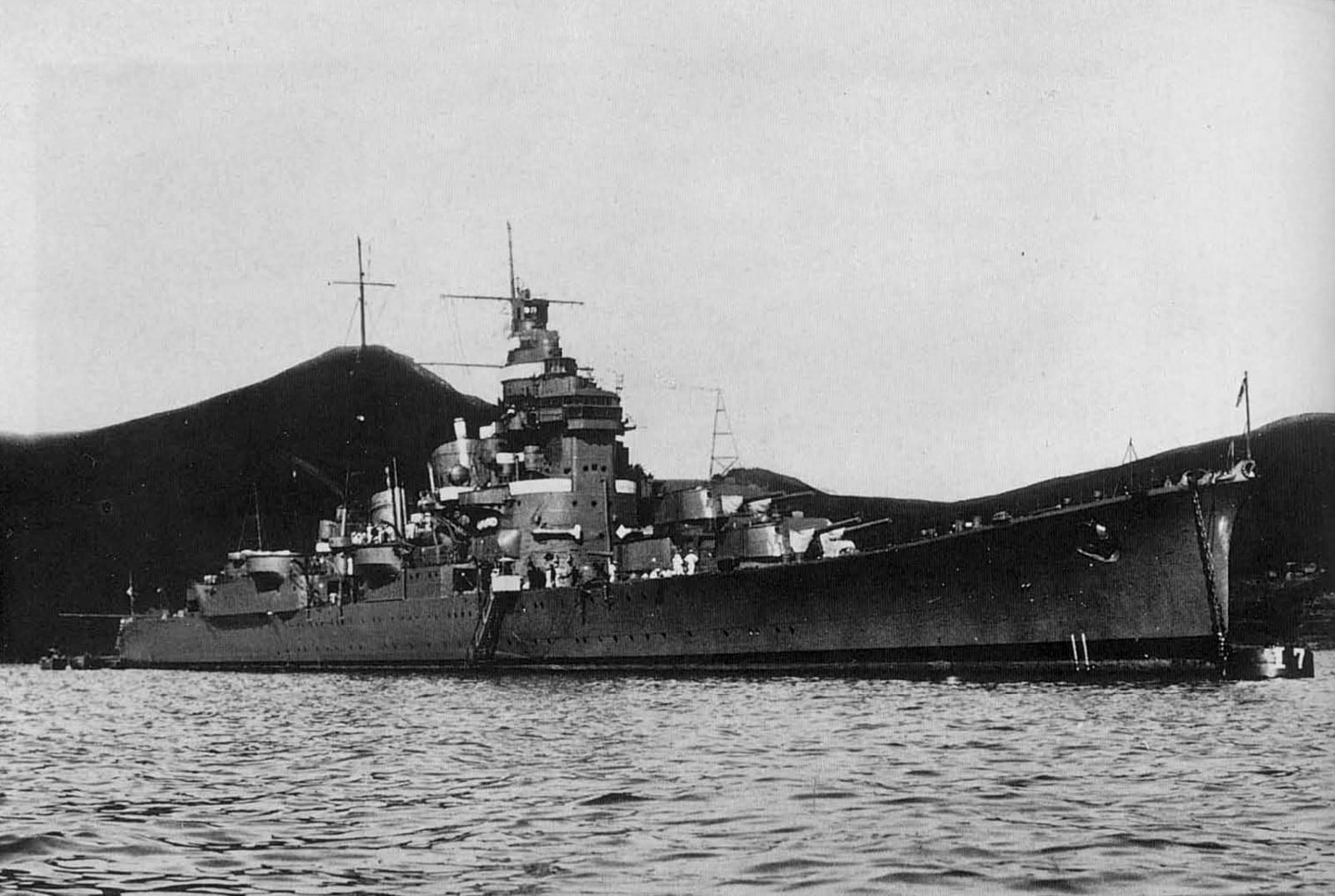
- Haguro under refit in 1936

History

Empire of Japan
- Name: Haguro
- Namesake: Mount Haguro
- Ordered: 1924
- Builder: Mitsubishi shipyard, Nagasaki
- Laid down: 16 March 1925
- Launched: 24 March 1928
- Commissioned: 25 April 1929
- Stricken: 20 June 1945
- Fate: Sunk in the Strait of Malacca, 16 May 1945

General characteristics
- Class & type: Myōkō-class cruiser
- Displacement: 13,300 long tons (13,513 t)
- Length: 201.7 m (661 ft 9 in)
- Beam: 20.73 m (68 ft 0 in)
- Draft: 6.32 m (20 ft 9 in)
- Installed power: 12 × water-tube boilers; 130,000 shp (97,000 kW)
- Propulsion: 4 × shafts; 4 × geared steam turbines
- Speed: 36 knots (67 km/h; 41 mph)
- Range: 8,000 nmi (15,000 km) at 14 knots (26 km/h; 16 mph)
- Complement: 773
- Armament: As completed: 10 × 200 mm (7.9 in) guns (5x2); 6 × 120 mm (4.7 in) guns (to 1934); 2 × 7.7 mm (0.30 in) machine guns; 12 × 610 mm (24 in) torpedo tubes (4x3); After first reconstruction: 10 × 203 mm (8.0 in) guns (5x2); 8 × 127 mm (5 in)/40 guns (4x2; from 1935); 8 × 13.2 mm (0.52 in) machine guns (2x4); 2 × 7.7 mm (0.30 in) machine guns; 16 × 610 mm (24 in) torpedo tubes (4x4)
- Armor: Main belt: 102 mm (4.0 in); Main deck: 37 mm (1.5 in); Turrets: 25 mm (0.98 in); Barbettes: 75 mm (3.0 in)
- Aircraft carried: 2 × floatplanes
- Aviation facilities: 1 × catapult

Haguro (羽黒) was a Myōkō-class heavy cruiser of the Imperial Japanese Navy, named after Mount Haguro in Yamagata Prefecture. Commissioned in 1929, Haguro saw significant service during World War II, participating in nine naval engagements between 1942 and 1945. As a heavy cruiser, she was better armed and armored than most surface vessels, and had multiple battles during her combat career. In the early part of the war, she engaged in vigorous shore bombardment duties to support the Japanese invasions of the Philippines and Dutch East Indies, and took part in the destruction of the Allied cruiser force defending the Dutch East Indies in the Battle of the Java Sea from 27 February to 1 March 1942. With torpedo hits, Haguro sank the Allied flagship, the light cruiser HNLMS De Ruyter, and the destroyer HNLMS Kortenaer, and received primary credit for sinking the heavy cruiser HMS Exeter with gunfire, and was not damaged during the entire battle.

After patrol duty, from 7–8 May, Haguro escorted aircraft carriers during the Battle of the Coral Sea, escorted the invasion force at the Battle of Midway, and escorted carriers during the Battle of the Eastern Solomons on 24 August. After a long series of patrol and escorting duties, Haguro fought an American cruiser-destroyer force at the Battle of Empress Augusta Bay, where she helped to damage the light cruiser USS Denver, but was hit by ten 6-inch (152 mm) shells from enemy cruisers, but most were duds, so she got off with light damage. After more patrol duties and surviving the occasional air raid, Haguro escorted carriers at the Battle of the Philippine Sea, where she aided the sinking aircraft carrier Taihō, and fought in the Battle of Leyte Gulf, surviving the submarine and air attacks that sank several Japanese ships, and in turn damaging several American warships and helping to sink the destroyer USS Hoel, while taking minor damage from shell and bomb hits.

After escaping back to mainland Japan, Haguro spent most of 1945 transiting between bases transporting cargo. In May, she was transporting troops when she was ambushed by Royal Navy destroyers in the Malacca Strait, the last surface battle between enemy warships. Haguro was sunk by at least nine torpedo hits and nearly an hour of gunfire. The wreck was discovered in 2010 and illegally salvaged in 2014.

== Design ==
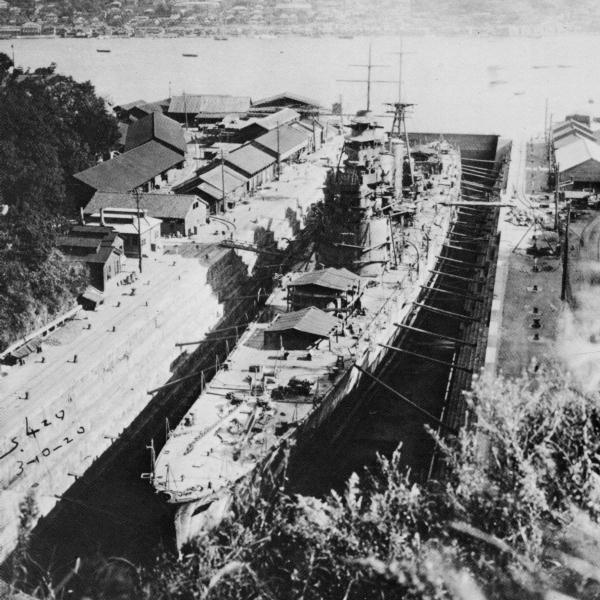
Haguro under construction in Nagasaki, 20 October 1928

Haguro was the third of the four-member Myōkō class of heavy cruisers (sometimes referred to as the Nachi class due to the second ship, Nachi, being completed before Myōkō, despite starting construction after); the other ships were Myōkō (妙高), Nachi (那智), and Ashigara (足柄).

The Myōkō class displaced 13,500 t (13,300 long tons), with a hull design similar to the preceding Aoba-class cruiser. They were 203.8 metres (669 ft) long with a beam of 19.5 metres (64 ft), and a draft of 6.36 metres (20.9 ft). Propulsion was by 12 Kampon boilers driving four sets of single-impulse geared turbine engines, with four shafts turning three-bladed propellers propelling the ship to 36 knots (67 km/h; 41 mph). Design endurance was 8,000 nautical miles; however, the increased weight issues reduced it to 7,000.

Haguro anchored in Yokosuka, July 1930

Protection was superior to the preceding Aoba class and accounted for about 16 percent of trial displacement. A 102 mm (4 in) side belt that ran along 123 m (404 ft) of the ship's length and 35 mm (1.4 in) armored deck protected the magazine and machinery spaces and 76 mm (3 in) protected the turret barbettes; however, the turrets had only 25mm splinter protection and the bridge was unarmored. Following innovations pioneered in Yubari, the armor belt was made an integral part of the hull structure to reduce weight. A torpedo bulkhead consisting of two 29 mm (1.1 in) plates with a total thickness of 58 mm (2.3 in) extended inwards from the bottom of the armor belt and curved to meet the bottom of the double hull. It was calculated that it was sufficient to withstand an explosion of 200 kg (441 lb) of TNT. As originally constructed, the class was armed with a main battery of ten 200 mm (7.9 in) 20 cm/50 3rd Year Type 1 GÔ naval guns mounted in 5 twin turrets, the heaviest armament of any heavy cruiser in the world at the time. Secondary armament initially were 12 cm/45 10th Year Type dual purpose guns in six single mounts. Short-range anti-aircraft defense was provided by two 7.7mm machine guns. Torpedo armament was unusually heavy compared to the cruisers of other nations at the time, with 12 carried in fixed single launchers inside the hull. They were also equipped with a single aircraft catapult and aircraft for scouting purposes.

In 1936, Haguro's offensive capabilities were drastically improved. Her 20 cm (7.9 in) guns were removed and replaced by ten 203 mm (8 in) guns, improving rate of fire and penetration power. Her 12 cm (4.7 in) dual guns were replaced by eight 127 mm/40 dual purposed naval gun in four twin turrets, a pair on each side, and her 4 triple torpedo tubes were replaced by 2 quadruple mounts, lowering the total number of torpedo tubes to 8. In exchange, Haguro was now capable of handling oxygen propelled type 93 torpedoes as opposed of older type 90 torpedoes. A second modernization in 1939 added an additional pair of quadruple torpedo mounts, increasing Haguro's armament to 16 torpedo tubes with a reload for each, alongside introducing an armament of type 96 25 mm AA guns.

== Construction and career ==
Haguro preparing to depart Yuiya Bay after her first refit, 29 April 1936

Haguro was laid down at the Mitsubishi shipyard in Nagasaki on 16 March 1925, launched and named on 24 March 1928, and was commissioned into the Imperial Navy on 25 April 1929. In October 1930, Haguro embarked on a voyage carrying Emperor Hirohito from Kobe to the battleship Kirishima from the 22nd to 25th.

Haguro anchored in Ariake Bay, pictured from her sistership Nachi, 3 November 1941

Between 1931 and 1933 she was commanded by Nomura Naokuni who subsequently achieved flag rank. In 1936, Haguro received her first modernizations, and took part in a variety of troop-ferrying and convoy-escorting missions during the Sino-Japanese war, but did not see combat.

== Second World War ==
By the time of Japan's entry into World War II with the attack on Pearl Harbor on 7 December 1941, Haguro was en route to the Philippines as part of a large cover force to support Japanese landings. Haguro saw her first action just four days later bombarding Legaspi, then she bombarded Davao on the night of 19–20 December after escorting troop transports, before she conducted more shore bombardment on Jolo on 24 December. On 4 January 1942, she survived B-17 bombing attacks undamaged, then took part in several more shore bombardment missions to aid in the invasion of Celebes. On 26 January, the submarine USS Sailfish fired four torpedoes at Haguro, but none hit their mark. On 10 February, Haguro bombarded Makassar, then on 20 January bombarded Timor to support Japanese troop landings.

=== Battle of the Java Sea ===
On 26 February, Haguro and her sister ship Nachi were escorting a large Japanese troop convoy passing through the Java Sea to support the Japanese invasion of the Dutch East Indies. En route, one of Nachi's floatplanes spotted a large Allied task force consisting of two heavy cruisers, three light cruisers, and nine destroyers attempting to intercept and destroy Japanese troop convoys. Haguro sped at full speed as Nachi's floatplane radioed the Allied ships' action.

==== Afternoon battle ====
By 6:00 on 27 February Haguro located the enemy ships and closed to a reasonable firing range. At around 28,000 yards (26,000 m), Haguro fired her ten 203 mm (8 in) guns, immediately targeting the Allied flagship, the Dutch light cruiser HNLMS De Ruyter. As the range drew closer, Haguro succeeded in hitting De Ruyter twice. The first hit the auxiliary motor room and started a small fire, killing one crewman and injuring six others, while the second penetrated unarmored portions of the ship without exploding. Even when they did not hit, Haguro's shells still straddled De Ruyter several times, causing light damage. In turn, several Allied cruisers targeted Haguro, which they reported to have blown up and sunk with gunfire damage.

In reality, Haguro was not hit once, and as a torpedo attack from Japanese destroyers forced the Allied ships to conduct evasive maneuvers, Haguro switched fire to the heavy cruiser HMS Exeter, one of the most capable ships of the task force. Exeter responded back, but gunnery was poor, and by the eighth salvo she had only managed to straddle Haguro. In stark contrast, closing to about 22,000 yards (20,000 m) Haguro hit Exeter twice. One 203 mm (8 in) shell struck the stern below the waterline, and more critically the other penetrated deep inside the ship and exploded, destroying six of her eight boilers and killing 14 men. Exeter's speed dropped to 5 knots (9.3 km/h; 5.8 mph), and the crippled ship was forced to withdraw from the battle. Almost simultaneously, Haguro fired a spread of eight type 93 torpedoes, and around 15 minutes later, one of these torpedoes hit the Dutch destroyer HNLMS Kortenaer. The destroyer was blown in half, the bow section rapidly sinking, and the stern section sinking several minutes later. 40 sailors went down with the ship. Fired from a distance of 22,000 yards, this was probably the longest ranged torpedo hit in history.

==== Night ambush ====
Immediately afterwards, Japanese ships sank the destroyer HMS Electra, and with one cruiser crippled and two destroyers sunk, Admiral Doorman aboard De Ruyter ordered a false retreat from the battle and seemed to do so successfully. However, unknown to Doorman, one of Haguro's floatplanes tracked down his ships and trailed the force. Haguro, joined by Nachi, used the details given to them to sail to an interception point. It was just before midnight that Haguro located the enemy force again, which were unaware of her presence. At around 16,000 yards (15,000 m), a stealthy torpedo attack was prepared, Nachi fired eight torpedoes, while Haguro unleashed four. A torpedo from Nachi hit the light cruiser HNLMS Java, which ignited her main battery magazines, blowing the cruiser in two and sinking her in two minutes with the loss of all but 19 men. Four minutes later, one of Haguro's torpedoes hit De Ruyter, destroying all power as the De Ruyter stopped dead in the water with significant flooding, and a massive fire broke out and enveloped the cruiser. Haguro's torpedo hit killed much of De Ruyter's damage-control crew, and the loss of all power disabled most of De Ruyter's damage-control equipment, meaning the massive fire could spread throughout the ship. Simultaneously, flooding slowly overwhelmed damage control and De Ruyter's list steadily increased. Over three hours, De Ruyter capsized and sank with the loss of 367 men, including Admiral Doorman and Captain Eugène Lacomblé. Shouts of Banzais could be heard across Haguro's deck as, having sunk the Allied flagship, the cruiser steamed from the battlefield. Depending on the source, she was either undetected, or spotted but Allied gunfire was ineffective.

==== Second battle of the Java Sea ====
Haguro on patrol off the Dutch East Indies in between the first and second battles of the Java Sea, 1 March 1942

On 1 March 1942, Haguro was assisting in the Java Sea landings when intelligence informed her that the still crippled Exeter, escorted by the destroyers HMS Encounter and USS Pope, unintentionally stumbled into her sister ships Myōkō and Ashigara while trying to escape from the Java Sea, with a long-range gunfight ensuing. Haguro and Nachi joined the battle almost an hour later, but neither side had managed to land a single hit. Together Haguro and Nachi engaged the cruiser, scoring their first hit five minutes later when a critical 8-inch (203 mm) shell hit disabled Exeter's electrical power, followed by another that exploded and destroyed Exeter's two remaining boilers, leaving her dead in the water. Gunfire from all four cruisers then destroyed Exeter's guns and lit her aflame, leading to her crew scuttling her. By this point, Haguro was almost entirely out of ammunition, with enough rounds for 13 salvos and just 4 torpedoes, causing her to retire from the engagement, while Myōkō and Ashigara joined the destroyers Kawakaze and Yamakaze in sinking the Encounter with gunfire. Pope temporarily escaped, but within two hours was crippled by aircraft from the light carrier Ryūjō and then finished off by gunfire with the arrival of Ashigara and Myōkō.

=== Further operations ===
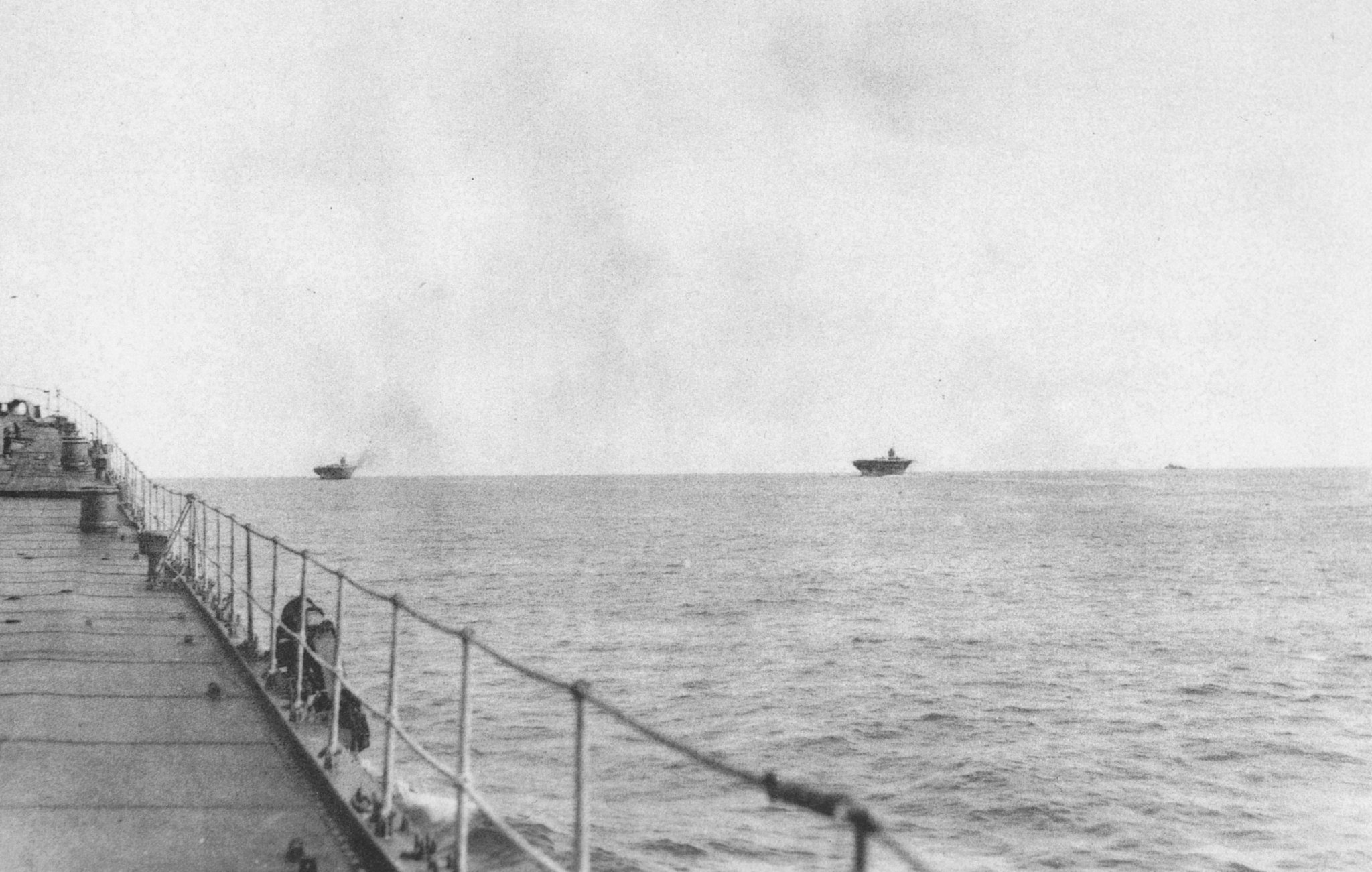
Haguro escorting the aircraft carriers Shōkaku and Zuikaku during Operation MO

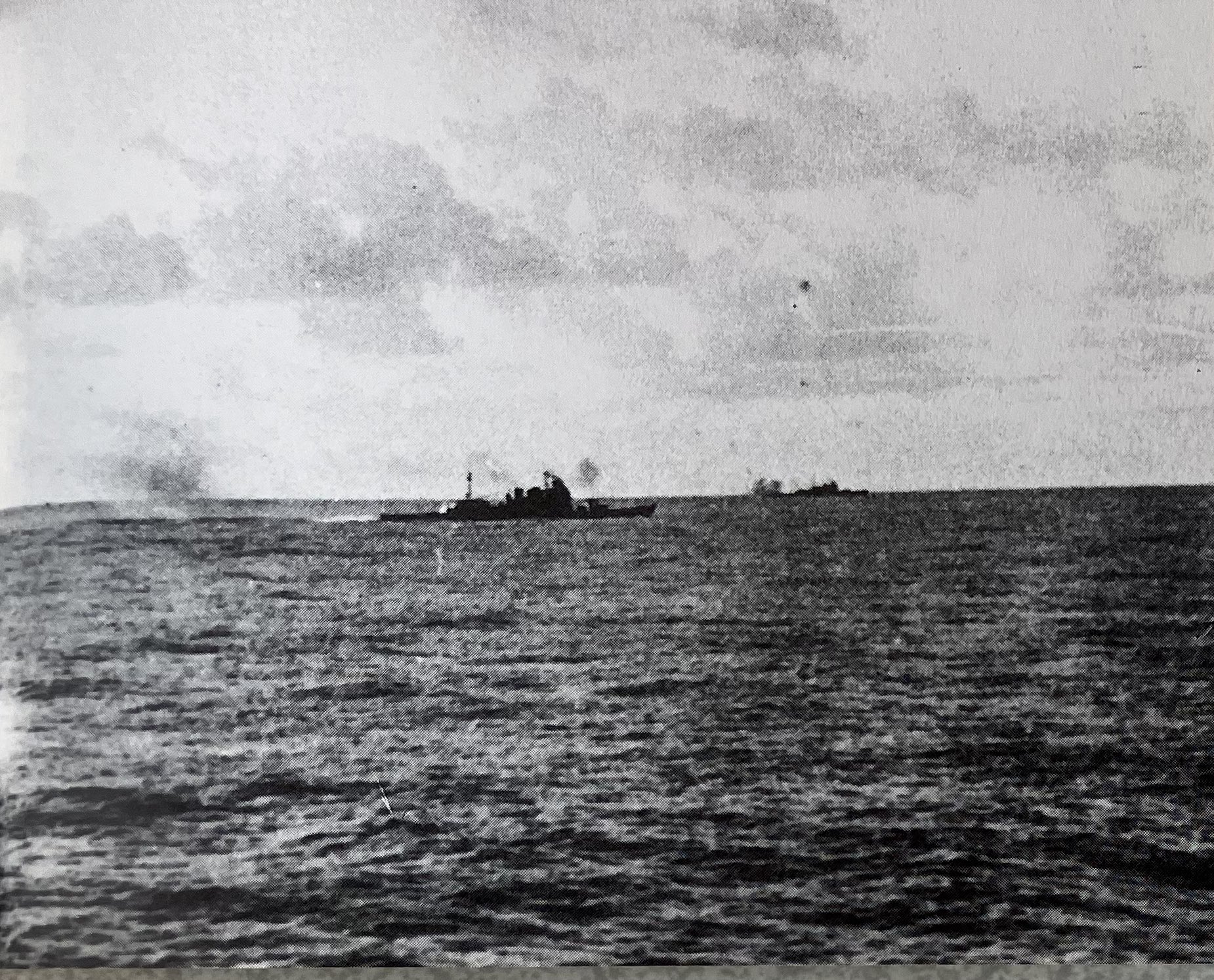
Haguro (right) and the heavy cruiser Takao performing AA duty during the battle of the Eastern Solomons, 24 August 1942

After the battle, the almost completely depleted Haguro returned to Kendari on 3 March, and spent the rest of the month transiting between various naval facilities before returning to mainland Japan. On April 18, Haguro was present during the attack on Tokyo by the aircraft carrier USS Hornet but was not damaged, and in turn served in the force that failed to track down the American task force responsible for the air raid, anchoring at Yokosuka on 22 March. Haguro spent the rest of the month preparing to support the planned invasion of Port Moresby. This commenced on 1 May when Haguro, Myōkō and six destroyers departed Truk as part of a larger escort to the aircraft carriers Shōkaku and Zuikaku, which fought in the Battle of the Coral Sea. Haguro's crew watched as the first aircraft carrier battle in history unfolded from 7–8 May, and for her part survived the carrier raids which crippled Shōkaku without suffering any damage herself before helping to assist the mauled but still-floating carrier. Haguro arrived back at Truk on 17 May, and returned to Kure on 22 May, then on the 27 May arrived at Hashirajima in preparation for the Battle of Midway, where Haguro escorted a large troop convoy for the planned invasion of Midway Island, a convoy which was called off on 6 June after the battle turned into a devastating defeat in which Japan lost four aircraft carriers and a heavy cruiser. Haguro spent the rest of the month assisting invasion convoys.

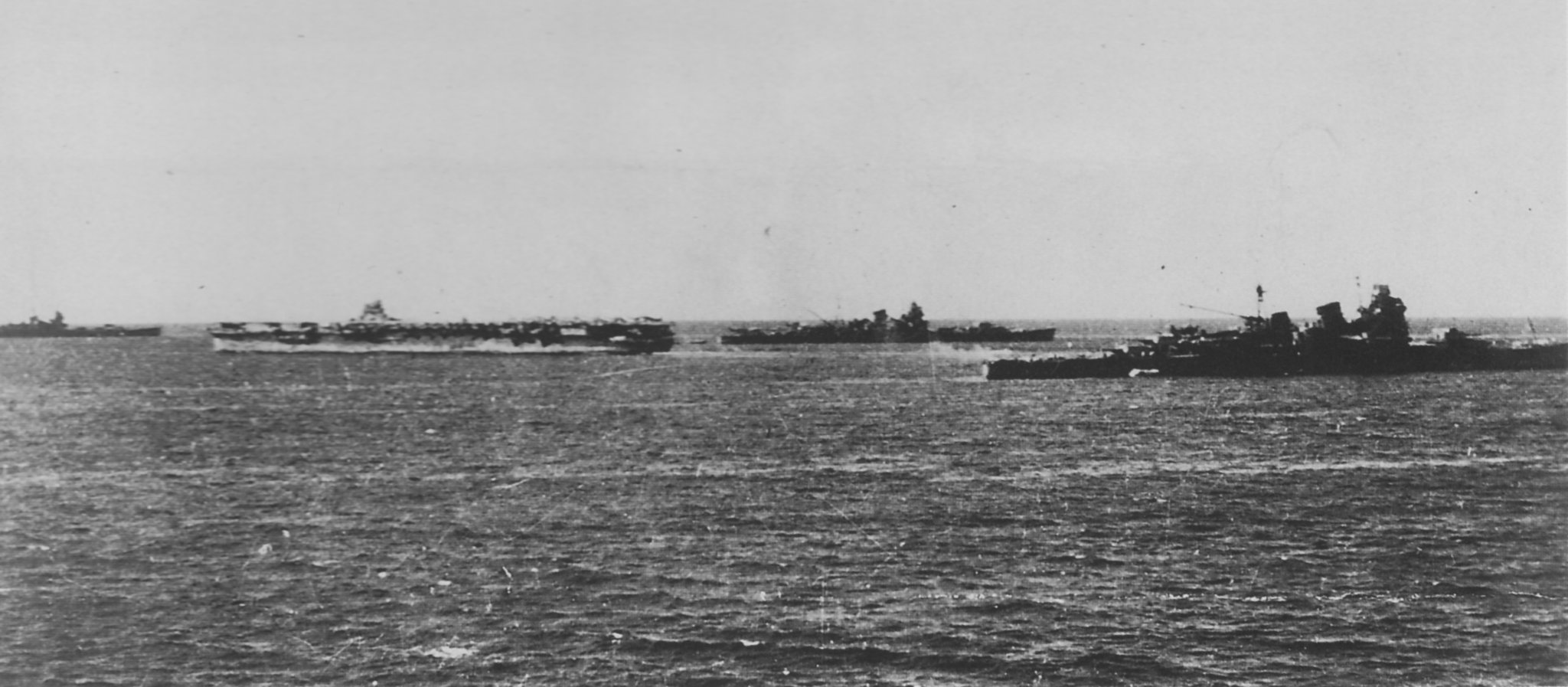
Haguro anchored off Eniwetok Atoll with the heavy cruisers Tone and Chikuma and aircraft carrier Zuikaku, 21 September 1943

Haguro did not sortie during July, only seeing her next action as an escort for Japanese aircraft carriers during the Battle of the Eastern Solomons on 24 August, coming under light air attacks but receiving no damage. In turn, Shōkaku and Zuikaku crippled the aircraft carrier USS Enterprise, but failed to stop the sinking of the light carrier Ryūjō, the destroyer Mutsuki, and a troop transport by enemy dive and torpedo bombers, resulting in an American victory. Haguro spent the rest of August and into September transiting between ports, surviving attacks by B-17 bombers without damage, before being docked for refit on 5 October. On 27 November, Haguro departed Sasebo alongside Myōkō on a troop transport mission to Truk, then returned to Kure by the end of the year. On 31 January 1943, Haguro escorted Japanese aircraft carriers which served as a cover force for the evacuation of Guadalcanal. She returned to Truk on 9 February. For the next few months, Haguro engaged in a series of uneventful patrol duties throughout the Indian Ocean, finally returning to Yokosuka later that May, before escorting navy responses to the invasion of Attu until June, when she was docked for refit which installed new sets of radar and several anti-aircraft guns. She returned to Japan on 19 July. Throughout August and September, Haguro engaged in troop and supply transport missions, surviving a raid from US carrier aircraft on 18 September without damage. At the end of September, Haguro attempted to track down the US Navy's Task Force 15, but failed to make contact, then took part in convoy escorting missions throughout October.

=== Battle of the Empress Augusta Bay ===
After a very, very long series of patrol and escorting duties without seeing combat, Haguro finally saw some significant action on 1 November, as she was moored near Rabaul when the Japanese command hatched a plan. Haguro and Myōkō, with an escort of the light cruisers Agano and Sendai and six destroyers, the Shiratsuyu, Shigure, Samidare, Hatsukaze, Naganami, and Wakatsuki, were tasked with intercepting and destroying the Allied protection forces escorting American troop convoys destined for Bougainville Island, in an attempt to replicate a Battle of Savo Island-style victory. While underway, one of Haguro's floatplanes spotted her target, an American task force consisting of four light cruisers, USS Cleveland, Columbia, Denver, and Montpelier, escorted by eight destroyers. Haguro and the others steamed in hopes of engaging the enemy force.

By 2:25 the next morning, the two forces came into contact with each other. Haguro fired, her salvos extremely tight, but missed her mark as her optics-based fire control was having trouble scoring early hits. In stark contrast, the four American cruisers with radar all opened fire on Sendai, immediately striking her with 6-inch (152 mm) gunfire, setting her on fire and disabling her guns and engines. In turn, Shiratsuyu, Shigure, and Samidare all fired their torpedoes at 16,000 yards, with one of Samidare's torpedoes blowing off the entire stern of the destroyer USS Foote and taking the destroyer out of action. However, due to her proximity to Sendai, Samidare was hit by three stray 6-inch (152 mm) shells before colliding with Shiratsuyu, heavily damaging both ships. Haguro avoided colliding with Wakatsuki, while Myōkō collided with Hatsukaze, damaging both ships.

Shortly afterwards Haguro finally found the range, and along with Myōkō displayed excellent marksmanship. With just three salvos each at 22,000 yards, they hit Denver with three 8-inch (203 mm) shell hits at the waterline, causing her to fall out of formation due to a flooded bow, damaged Columbia with an 8-inch (203 mm) shell that punched through her plating and landed in a sail locker, and straddled Montpelier several times. However, Cleveland, Columbia, and Montpelier all fired on Haguro, hitting the ship with ten 6-inch (152 mm) shells over a ten minute period, smashing into Haguro's turret 2, port flight deck and catapult, aft deck hospital room, and paint shed. However, six out of the ten hits were duds, and thus only superficial damage was inflicted, killing only one of Haguro's men and injuring five others. Shortly afterwards, Myōkō hit the waterline of the destroyer USS Spence with an 8-inch (203 mm) shell; the Spence, which had just begun to fire on the already-damaged Hatsukaze, retired from the action.

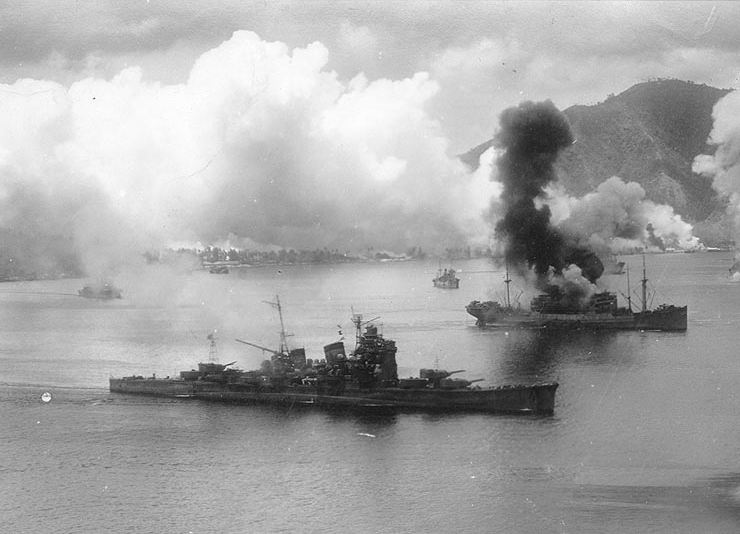
Haguro under attack during the bombing of Rabaul mere hours after the battle of the Empress Augusta Bay, 2 November 1943

However, the Japanese received far more damage than they inflicted. Sendai had already been turned into a flaming wreck by gunfire from the four American cruisers, then sunk with most of her crew in a one-sided massacre. Spence then called upon Captain Arleigh Burke's Destroyer Division 45, consisting of USS Charles Ausburne, Claxton, Dyson, and Stanly, to deliver the final blow to the crippled Hatsukaze, which they finished off with gunfire. Deciding to cut their losses, Haguro and the other Japanese ships retreated. Not only had they lost more tonnage than they damaged, they failed to disrupt the American landings in any way. Upon arriving back at Rabaul, the port came under attack from nearly 160 American aircraft in the bombing of Rabaul, which ended the Japanese threat to Bougainville. Haguro was attacked and photographed several times, but was not damaged. Three days later, Haguro left Rabaul for Truk, arriving five days later, before further retreating to Sasebo for repairs. Haguro spent the rest of the year ferrying ground troops to Truk.

Throughout the first half of 1944, Haguro often transited between various Japanese occupied ports, but did not see combat. On 13 June, Haguro joined a large force assembled in Tokyo and intended to defend the Philippines against American recapture. Haguro departed two days later as an escort for Japanese aircraft carriers, specifically the new armored carrier Taihō. However, the force was immediately spotted by American submarines and tracked for the next few days. On 19 June, the force was attacked by the submarine USS Albacore, which unleashed a spread of six torpedoes, one of which hit Taihō. The damage was initially manageable, but gas fumes leaked throughout the ship, causing the carrier to ignite in a fiery explosion and sink. Haguro assisted the sinking carrier, but the idea of taking Taihō under tow was abandoned, and the carrier was left to sink. The destroyer Wakatsuki then ferried Admiral Ozawa from the sinking Taihō to Haguro, with the cruiser serving as the Japanese flagship for the rest of the day before Ozawa again transferred, to Zuikaku. Haguro the next day survived the followup attacks by American aircraft carrier planes, watching as the aircraft carrier Hiyō and two oil tankers were sunk.

Haguro returned to Okinawa on 22 June, and two days later was drydocked in Kure for refit, receiving 52 additional AA guns and upgraded type 13 and 22 radar. She was undocked six days later and immediately departed on a troop transport mission to Manila. She then spent July operating off Singapore, before spending the next few months on vigorous training duties.

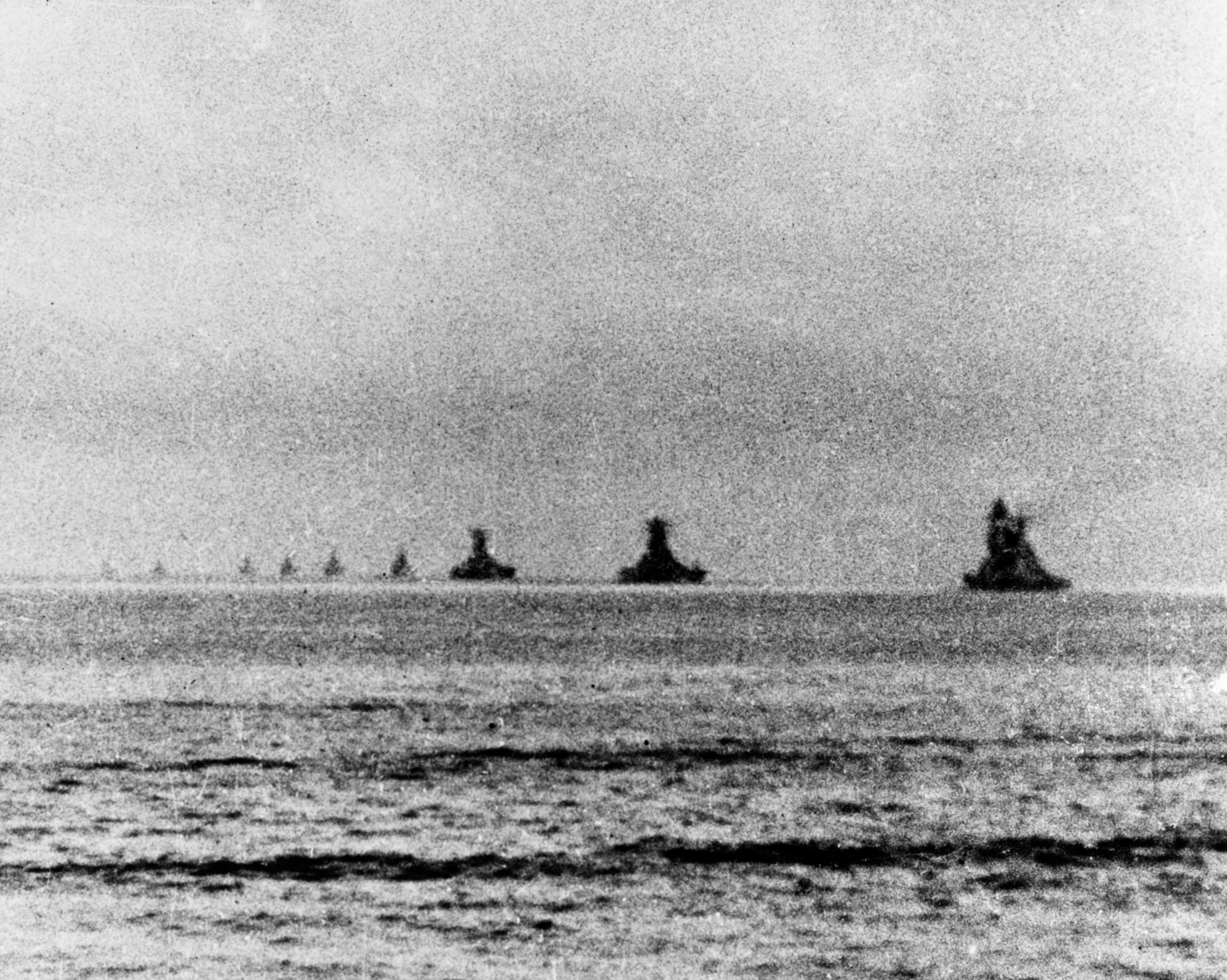
The Japanese fleet departing Brunei for the battle of Leyte Gulf. Haguro is the 2nd farthest ship in the picture, in front of Myōkō

=== Battle of Leyte Gulf ===
On 18 October 1944, Haguro departed with a massive Japanese fleet for Brunei, arriving two days later. The fleet, led by Admiral Takeo Kurita, consisted of Japan's two "super battleships" Yamato and Musashi, the largest and most powerful battleships in the world, supported by the older battleships Nagato, Kongō, and Haruna, ten heavy cruisers (including Haguro), two light cruisers, and 15 destroyers. Their plan was to intercept the extremely critical American invasion convoys heading through Leyte Gulf for the Philippine invasion, as the Philippines served as a crucial supply point between the Dutch East Indies and Japan.

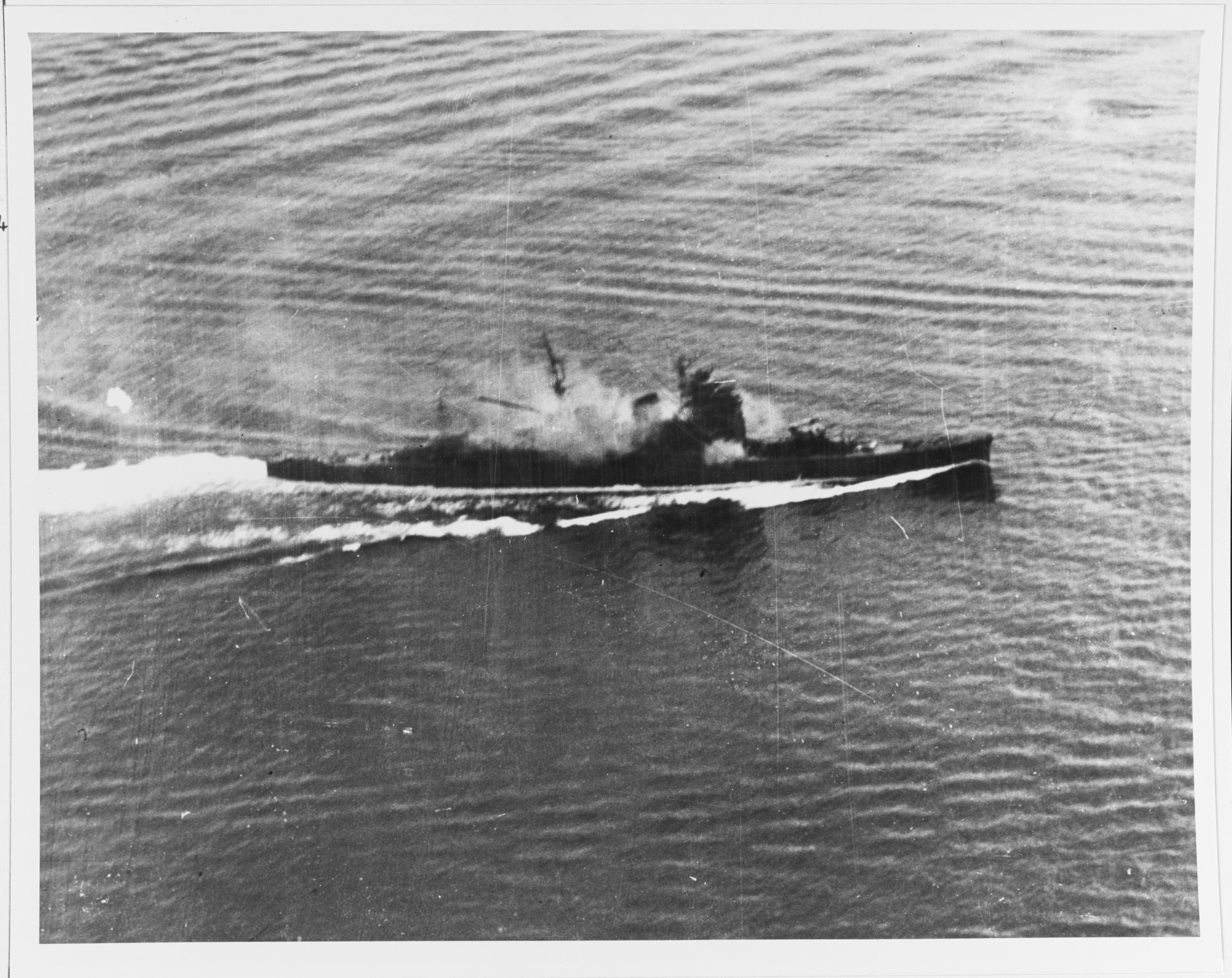
Haguro under carrier aircraft attacks in the Sibuyan Sea, 24 October 1944

On 22 October, the fleet departed Brunei for battle, Haguro in a line of cruisers following the battleships. However, in the darkness of the early morning of 23 October, the fleet was intercepted by the submarines USS Darter and Dace, which torpedoed and sank the heavy cruisers Atago and Maya, respectively. Shortly afterwards, two torpedoes from a salvo from Darter forced Haguro to maneuver to avoid damage. The heavy cruiser Takao was hit by two torpedoes and forced to retire from the battle, taking the destroyers Asashimo and Naganami for protection.

With three heavy cruisers and two destroyers out of the fight, the fleet regrouped into two circular formations, Haguro serving in the leading group centering around Yamato in anticipation of air attacks. These fears proved correct when aircraft from five American fleet carriers raided the center force in the afternoon of 24 October. Haguro came under attack several times, being strafed, but was not hit. This was because the majority of the air attacks were focused on Musashi, which over nine hours was hit by at least 17 bombs and 19–20 torpedoes, sinking by the bow that evening. Meanwhile, Myōkō was hit by an aerial torpedo which dropped her speed to 15 knots and forced her to retire, resulting in Vice Admiral Hashimoto transferring his flag to Haguro as she continued on with the fleet.

==== Battle off Samar ====
On the morning of 25 October, Haguro was underway when the Japanese Center Force encountered Taffy 3, a task force of six American escort carriers, three destroyers, and four destroyer escorts. Admiral Kurita aboard Yamato mistook the escort carriers for fleet carriers, and by size comparison the destroyers for cruisers and destroyer escorts for destroyers, and ordered an all-out attack. Haguro charged at the enemy fleet, hoping to catch up to the carriers, but at 7:23, at 10,300 yards, Haguro located a US "cruiser" attempting a torpedo attack and turned to engage. This "cruiser" was actually the destroyer USS Hoel, which was attempting to engage Kongō. On her first salvo, Haguro hit Hoel with two 8-inch (203 mm) shells, one hitting her bridge and the other her main rangefinder, destroying her mark 37 director, FD radar, PPI scope, machine gun control, and all voice radio communications. A second salvo hit Hoel with another 8-inch (203 mm) shell above her boiler room. Haguro's third salvo then hit with three more 8-inch (203 mm) shells, the first two destroying the after generator and port engine, flooding the after engine and disabling all lighting aft. The third hit her No 3 handing room, starting a powder fire and destroying her turret 3. This damage prompted Hoel to unleash five torpedoes and retreat, only to be hit by three more 8-inch (203 mm) shells, two knocking turrets 4 and 5 out of action, while the third destroyed two 20 mm AA guns. Finally, one of Haguro's 5-inch (127 mm) secondary shells hit Hoel's bow below the waterline, causing minor flooding.

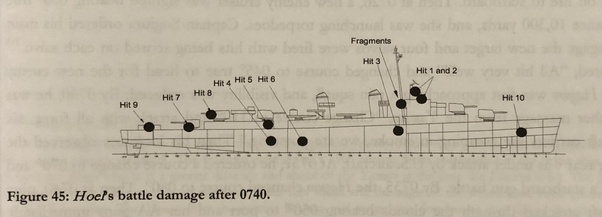
Damage inflicted to USS Hoel by Haguro, which helped to sink her

With four salvos, Haguro hit Hoel with nine 8-inch (203 mm) shells and one 5-inch (127 mm) shell, destroying three of Hoel's five 5-inch (127 mm) guns, her port engine, after generator, bridge, and main battery director, as well as inflicting other damage. Had Haguro correctly identified Hoel as a destroyer and not a cruiser, the hits to the turrets and handing room would have likely detonated her magazines and sank her then and there. However, Haguro fired armor-piercing shells that penetrated Hoel's unarmored hull without exploding. Still, the damage was significant, and the crippled Hoel was later finished off by gunfire from Yamato and Nagato.

After helping to sink Hoel, Haguro continued on to engage the escort carriers. At 7:50, Haguro twice hit the escort carrier USS Fanshaw Bay at a distance of 17,200 yards. Both 8-inch (203 mm) shells hit her flight deck near the bow, poking holes in the ship but not causing any significant damage, again due to the use of AP shells. Shortly after 8:00, Haguro switched fire to the escort carrier USS Kalinin Bay, with the carrier responding with her lone 5-inch (127 mm) gun. In a running gun duel, which the heavy cruiser Tone joined in at 8:18, Kalinin Bay was hit by three 8-inch (203 mm) shells, two of which hit the stern and caused minor flooding, while the third holed her bow. Two near misses also detonated underneath her fantail, causing more damage than the direct hits and flooding her stern. In turn, Haguro was hit by two 5-inch (127 mm) shells from Kalinin Bay which damaged her radio transmitter and communication cables. However, at 8:25 planes from Fanshaw Bay hit Haguro with two 100-pound bombs, one of which hit the ammunition storage of her turret 2, killing 30 sailors and injuring 12, forcing the flooding of her turret 2 barbette to prevent a magazine detonation and taking the turret out of action for the rest of the battle.

Haguro temporarily retreated to conduct repairs. After 8:30, she returned to the battlefield, where she joined Tone in continuing to pound Kalinin Bay. Closing to 10,100 yards, Haguro and Tone struck Kalinin Bay with another eleven 8-inch (203 mm) shell hits, the first two punching through her hangar bay, while the third holed her below the waterline, passed through the ship, and detonated after coming out the other side and hitting the water, effectively acting as a near miss. This shell disabled the ship's fuel lines, shredded her forward bulkhead, and caused notable flooding. The next two hits again punched through the flight deck, while another holed her bow above the waterline. The rest of the hits all plunged into Kalinin Bay's flight deck, starting a fire which raged throughout the hangar bay. In addition to the direct hits, several damaging near misses resulted in seawater flooding the ship. In total, Kalinin Bay took fourteen direct 8-inch (203 mm) rounds, seven each from Haguro and Tone, a 14-inch (356 mm) shell from Haruna, and after the surface action two kamikazes. Despite this, she would not sink, undoubtedly due to the use of armor-piercing shells that failed to explode upon hitting the ship, when high explosive shells would have detonated and sunk the carrier.

Concluding her target had sunk, at 8:55, Haguro and Tone switched fire back to Fanshaw Bay, Tone hit Fanshaw Bay once, Haguro three times, the combined damage starting four small fires in her hangar bay as a result of cutting power lines and disabling one of her catapults. Finally, Haguro engaged the destroyer escort USS Dennis, and succeeded in hitting her with four 8-inch (203 mm) shells, resulting in minor flooding to her bow and disabling her forward 5-inch (127 mm) gun turret.

==== Japanese retreat ====
The Japanese center force retreating from Taffy 3. Yamato is seen in the center, and Haguro ahead of her.

Haguro fired her last salvo at 9:12. During the course of the engagement, she unleashed a total of 345 8-inch (203 mm) rounds. With the sinking of the heavy cruisers Chikuma, Chōkai, and Suzuya to air attacks, and the damaging of several more, while believing his ships had sunk at least two fleet carriers (if not more) and multiple cruisers and destroyers, Kurita ordered a withdrawal. Haguro, while retreating with the other Japanese ships, spotted the formation of escort carriers that made up Taffy 2, but chose not to attack. Just before 11:00, aircraft from American carriers attacked. Haguro's AA guns responded, but failed to shoot down any planes. Haguro was undamaged, as most of the planes ignored her and targeted Yamato, which they too failed to damage. More air attacks ensued the next two days, sinking the light cruiser Noshiro and the destroyers Hayashimo, Fujinami, and Shiranui. However, Haguro was attacked by a single plane whose bomb landed a damaging near miss to her port side.

On 28 October, Haguro returned to Brunei with the rest of the fleet. The battle was a devastating defeat. Japan had lost three battleships, an aircraft carrier, three light carriers, six heavy cruisers, three light cruisers, and 11 destroyers, and in turn sank just one American light carrier, two escort carriers, two destroyers, and two destroyer escorts. This battle crippled the Japanese navy, rendering it unable to effectively operate as a fleet due to the oil fields of the Dutch East Indies being cut off and the sheer number of Japanese ships sunk in both the battle and its immediate aftermath. Despite helping to sink a destroyer and damaging several other ships, Haguro failed to engage her intended target of the American troop convoys, as with the rest of the fleet, rendering the Battle of Leyte Gulf both a crushing tactical and strategic victory for the Allied forces.

The day after reaching Brunei, Haguro was refueled by Tone, and on 6 November the aircraft carrier Junyō and her escorts arrived at Brunei to restock Haguro's guns (excluding the unrepaired turret 2). On the 8th, with the allied invasion of the Philippines increasing in success Haguro attempted to escort the fleet out of Brunei, only for the fleet to return to Brunei on the 11th. The 16th saw an attack by US army aircraft lightly damage Haguro with bomb near miss and splinter damage. Three days later, Haguro left Brunei for the last time escorting the battleship Haruna to Lingga, but the 22nd saw Haruna run aground and damage herself, which resulted the group redirecting for Singapore where Haguro arrived later that afternoon. The start of December saw Haguro drydocked for hull repairs, where the barrels to her still unrepaired turret 2 were removed and a makeshift roof was attached to protect the exposed turret from weather. Haguro left drydock on 16 December, where her crew was informed of her sister ship Myōkō – still unrepaired from the torpedo damage inflicted at the battle of Leyte Gulf – being hit by another torpedo from the submarine USS Bergall and left limping at 6 knots without steering. Two days later, Haguro let Singapore to take Myōkō under tow. Haguro found her crippled sister ship the next day, but rough seas prevented a tow line from connecting for the next 4 days. It was only on the 23rd that the weather calmed enough for Haguro to finally take Myōkō under tow, where they arrived at Singapore two days later.

With the start of 1945 Haguro was reassigned to the Southwest area fleet, and from 22 to 30 January was drydocked for repairs to her number 3 oil tank. She immediately departed for Lingga and arrived on the 31st, where she remained at anchor for the entirety of February; the 5th saw Haguro reassigned to Tenth area fleet before the 24th saw Haguro survive an attack by US air force bombers undamaged. Haguro finally left Lingga on 20 March on a return journey to Singapore, where a mine exploded nearby and spooked the cruiser's crew, but no damage was inflicted. On 9 April, Haguro left Singapore for a supply run to Jakarta with 700 troops, escorted by the destroyer Kamikaze. She arrived on the 11th and unloaded her cargo, then returned to Keppel Harbor on the 15th. On 3 May, Haguro was dry-docked in Nagasaki where her torpedo tubes and much of her 203 mm (8 in) ammunition were removed to make storage space, and she left dry-dock on the 7th

=== Battle of the Malacca Strait ===
In May 1945, Haguro was the target of the British "Operation Dukedom" and was ambushed when in company with the destroyer Kamikaze. The 26th Destroyer Flotilla found her just after midnight on 16 May, and began the attack. During the battle, Kamikaze was lightly damaged, but Haguro was hit by gunfire and three Mark IX torpedoes from the British destroyers. She soon began to slow down and took a 30-degree list to port.

At 02:32, after receiving an hour of gunfire and around nine torpedoes, Haguro finally began to go down stern first in the Malacca Strait, 55 mi (48 nmi; 89 km) off Penang; Kamikaze rescued 320 survivors, but 751 men, including Vice Admiral Hashimoto and Rear Admiral Sugiura, perished with her. Rear Admiral Sugiura was posthumously promoted to vice admiral on 16 May. Haguro was the last major Japanese warship to be sunk in a surface action during the war.

Haguro was stricken from the Navy list on 20 June.

== Wreck ==
On 4 March 2003, a group of specialized shipwreck divers operating off MV Empress discovered the wreck of Haguro in 67 metres (220 ft) of water in the Malacca Strait south of Penang. The wreck sits upright, covered in places by discarded trawler nets with her hull opposite her forward turrets buried in the seabed to about her original waterline, but this level gradually reduces until at the stern her outer propellers and shafts are actually up above the seabed. Her foremast and the top half of the bridge structure are missing/collapsed. Her mainmast is collapsed. Her funnels are missing. British hits are visible in places. The bow section forward of no. 2 turret is badly damaged by torpedo hits. Haguro's no. 1 turret and barbette are uprooted and lie against the hull, the rear of the turret on the starboard sea bed and the barrels pointing vertically towards the surface. Her no. 2 turret is trained to starboard at approximately the 1 o'clock position, with its roof collapsed and both barrels and breeches missing, as they were not replaced after being damaged by a bomb at the earlier Battle of Leyte Gulf. Her no. 3 turret's guns are askew and trained to the port quarter at the 8 o'clock position. Both her stern main turrets' guns point almost directly astern. Just behind the no. 5 turret, the wreck is broken in half, although the very stern section is still "partially" attached and heavily damaged on the port side.

In 2010 a further diving expedition surveyed the wreck in detail. In 2014 the wreck was among five located in the region reported to have been heavily destroyed by illegal salvors.
