= USS Clifton Sprague =

1980 American guided missile frigate

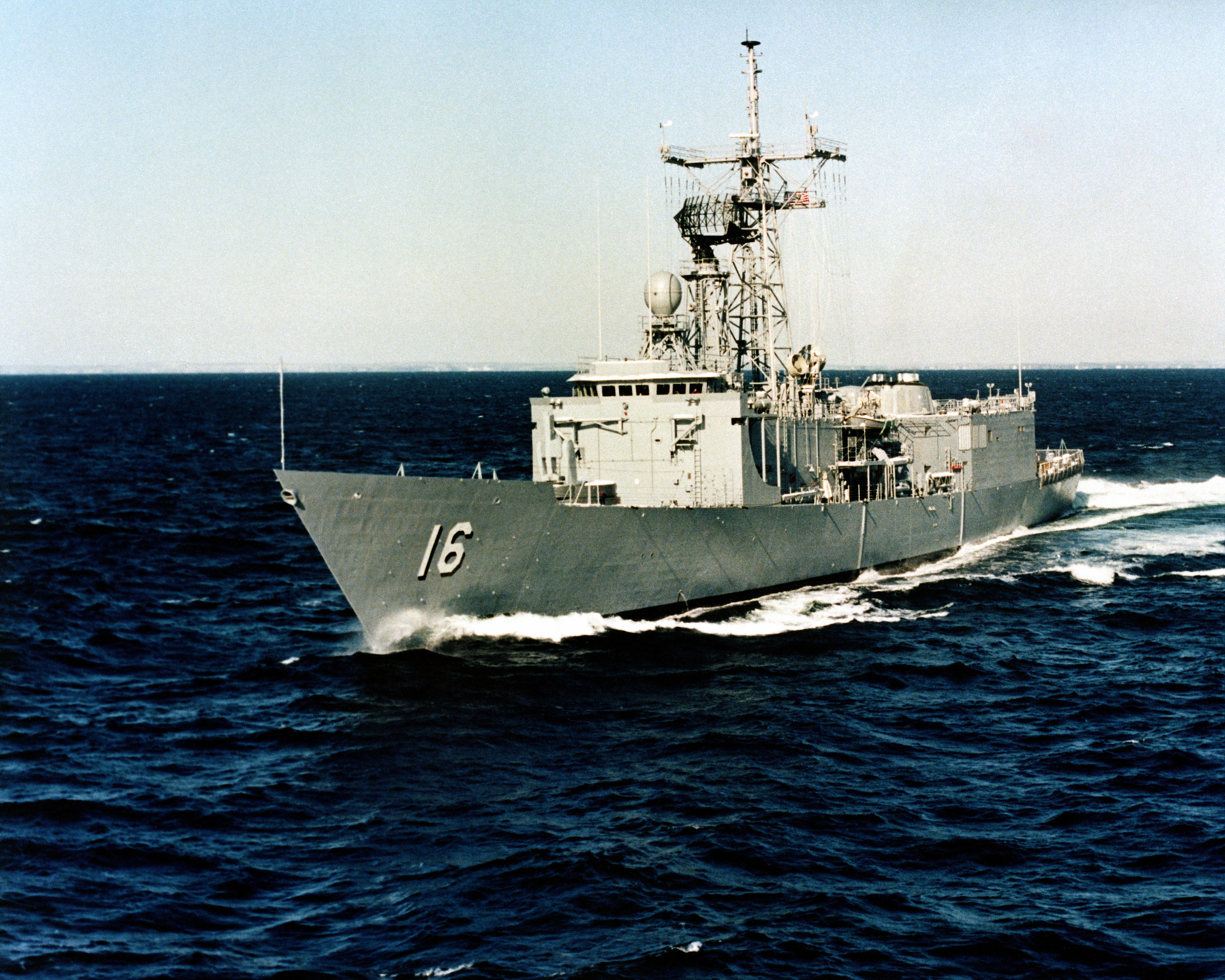
- USS Clifton Sprague, 17 November 1980

History

United States
- Name: Clifton Sprague
- Namesake: Vice Admiral Clifton A. F. Sprague
- Ordered: 27 February 1976
- Builder: Bath Iron Works, Bath, Maine
- Laid down: 30 July 1979
- Launched: 16 February 1980
- Sponsored by: Courtney Sprague Vaughan, daughter of Adm. Sprague
- Commissioned: 21 March 1981
- Decommissioned: 2 June 1995
- Stricken: 4 September 1997
- Home port: Naval Station Mayport
- Identification: Hull symbol:FFG-16; Code letters:NCAS
- Motto: "Nunc Paratus" (Ready Now)
- Fate: Disposed of through the Security Assistance Program (SAP)
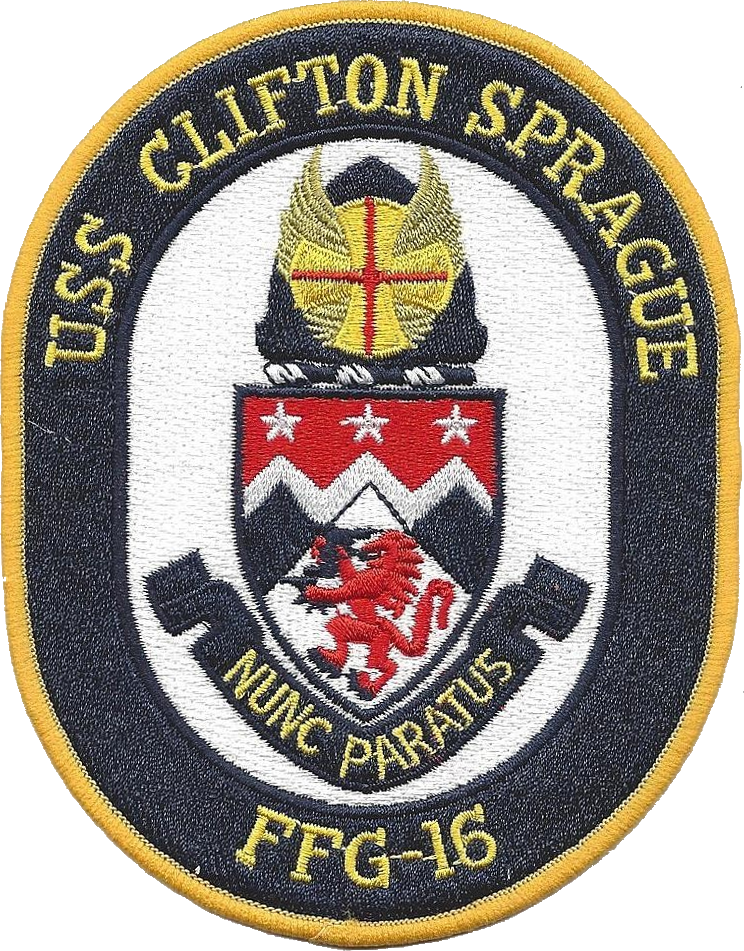
- Badge

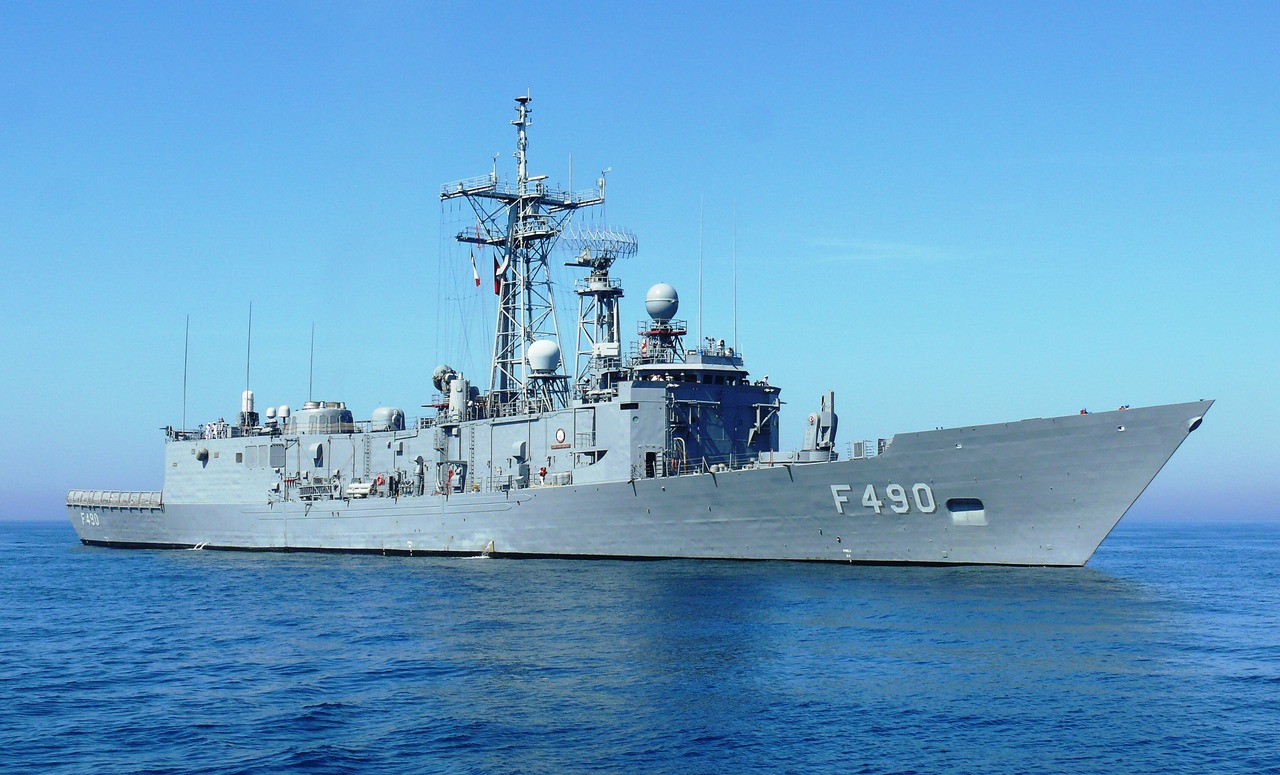
- TCG Gaziantep, 31 May 2010

History

Turkey
- Name: TCG Gaziantep
- Namesake: City of Gaziantep
- Acquired: 27 August 1997
- Identification: Hull number: F 490
- Status: in active service

General characteristics
- Class & type: Oliver Hazard Perry-class frigate
- Displacement: 4,100 long tons (4,200 t), full load
- Length: 445 feet (136 m), overall
- Beam: 45 feet (14 m)
- Draft: 22 feet (6.7 m)
- Propulsion: 2 × General Electric LM2500-30 gas turbines generating 41,000 shp (31 MW) through a single shaft and variable pitch propeller; 2 × Auxiliary Propulsion Units, 350 hp (260 kW) retractable electric azimuth thrusters for maneuvering and docking.
- Speed: over 29 knots (54 km/h)
- Range: 5,000 nautical miles at 18 knots (9,300 km at 33 km/h)
- Complement: 15 officers and 190 enlisted, plus SH-60 LAMPS detachment of roughly six officer pilots and 15 enlisted maintainers
- Sensors & processing systems: As Built: AN/SPS-49 air-search radar; AN/SPS-55 surface-search radar; CAS and STIR fire-control radar; AN/SQS-56 sonar.; G-Class Frigate: Combat Management System: GENESIS (Gemi Entegre Savaş İdare Sistemi); Search radar: SMART-S Mk2
- Electronic warfare & decoys: AN/SLQ-32
- Armament: As built: 1 × OTO Melara Mk 75 76 mm/62 caliber naval gun; 2 × Mk 32 triple-tube (324 mm) launchers for Mark 46 torpedoes; 1 × Vulcan Phalanx CIWS; 4 × .50-cal (12.7 mm) machine guns.; 1 × Mk 13 Mod 4 single-arm launcher for Harpoon anti-ship missiles and SM-1MR Standard anti-ship/air missiles (40 round magazine); Note: As of 2004, Mk 13 systems removed from all active US vessels of this class.; G-Class Frigate: 1 × Mk 15 Phalanx CIWS; 1 × Oto Melara 76mm DP gun; 8 × Harpoon SSM; 40 × SM-1 MR SAM; 32 × ESSM launched from Mk-41 VLS (4 ESSM missiles per MK-41 cell through the use of MK25 Quadpack canisters, total of 8 cells); Two triple Mark 32 Anti-submarine warfare torpedo tubes with Mark 46 or Mark 50 anti-submarine warfare torpedoes
- Aircraft carried: 1 × SH-2F LAMPS I helicopter

USS Clifton Sprague (FFG-16) was an Oliver Hazard Perry-class guided missile frigate of the United States Navy, the tenth ship of that class. She was named for Vice Admiral Clifton A. F. Sprague (1896–1955), hero of the Battle off Samar action of the Battle of Leyte Gulf, where he received the Navy Cross. Clifton Sprague (FFG-16) was the first ship of that name in the US Navy. She was transferred to the Turkish Naval Forces in 1997 as TCG Gaziantep (F 490) and remains in active service.

== History ==
Ordered from Bath Iron Works on 27 February 1976 as part of the FY76 program, Clifton Sprague was laid down 30 July 1979, launched 16 February 1980, and commissioned 21 March 1981.

Clifton Sprague was part of the forces during Operation Urgent Fury, the US led 1983 Invasion of Grenada. The frigate served as the clandestine mother ship for a pre-invasion reconnaissance team of Navy SEALs and Air Force combat controllers. Prior to D-Day on 25 Oct., the 20-man commando force twice attempted to use small boats launched from the frigate to reach a new airport under construction on Grenada's southwest coast. Their nighttime attempts to make an assessment of its military defenses and the condition of its uncompleted runway were frustrated both times by rough seas, equipment failures and bad luck.

In July 1993, the guided-missile cruiser USS Gettysburg and Clifton Sprague participated in a passing exercise (PASSEX) with three Russian ships, cruiser Marshal Ustinov, destroyer Admiral Kharlamov and the replenishment ship Dnester. This was noteworthy because the two navies had an adversarial relationship for decades prior to the Dissolution of the Soviet Union.

Clifton Sprague was part of the flotilla for Operation Uphold Democracy, the September 1995 US intervention in Haiti.

She was decommissioned on 2 June 1995 at Naval Station Mayport, Florida, and was stricken from the US Navy register on 4 September 1997 after being transferred to Turkey.

== TCG Gaziantep (F 490) ==
She was transferred to Turkey on 27 August 1997 as that nation's TCG Gaziantep (F 490), and then immediately modified into a G-class frigate by the Turkish Naval Yard.

== Awards ==
Clifton Sprague and her crew received the following unit awards, according to the US Navy unit awards website:

- Navy E Ribbon, 1 October 1980 to 30 September 1981
- Navy E Ribbon, 1 October 1981 to 30 September 1982
- Navy Expeditionary Medal, 18 April 1983 to 22 April 1983, 1983 United States embassy bombing, Lebanon
- Meritorious Unit Commendation, 23 October 1983 to 2 November 1983, Invasion of Grenada / Operation Urgent Fury
- Armed Forces Expeditionary Medal, 23 October 1983 to 18 November 1983, Invasion of Grenada / Operation Urgent Fury
- Navy E Ribbon 1 October 1983 to 31 March 1985
- Navy E Ribbon 1 April 1985 to 30 September 1986
- Coast Guard Special Operations Service Ribbon for 1 April 1989
- Coast Guard Special Operations Service Ribbon, 1 July 1989 to 30 September 1989
- Secretary of the Navy Letter of Commendation, 1 December 1989 to 1 April 1990
- Joint Meritorious Unit Award, 28 January 1991 to 25 February 1991, this was in the Desert Storm time period, but FFG-16 was not listed as participating in the Gulf War.
- Armed Forces Expeditionary Medal, 16 September 1994 to 24 September 1994, Operation Uphold Democracy Haiti
- Meritorious Unit Commendation, 11 September 1994 to 31 March 1995, Operation Uphold Democracy Haiti
- National Defense Service Medal for service during the Gulf War era

Clifton Sprague was also nominated for the United States Public Health Service Outstanding Unit Citation for operations from 24 June 1994 to 12 July 1994, but did not receive the award. This was around the time that many refugees were fleeing Haiti in small boats.
