= Thomas L. Sprague =

United States Navy admiral

Thomas Lamison Sprague
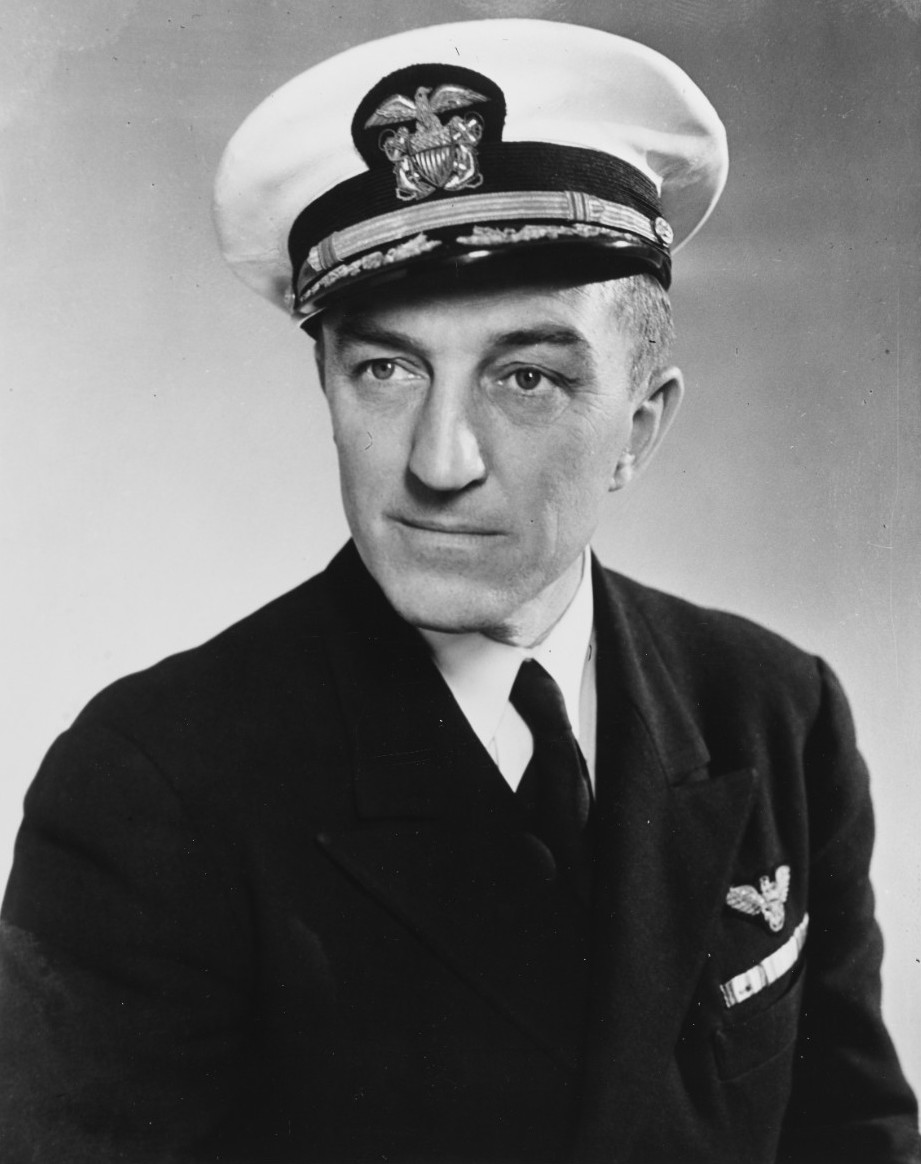
- Official portrait, 1949
- Born: October 2, 1894; Lima, Ohio, U.S.
- Died: September 17, 1972 (aged 77); Chula Vista, California, U.S.
- Military career
- Allegiance: United States
- Branch: United States Navy
- Service years: 1917–1952
- Rank: Vice Admiral
- Commands: USS Montgomery (DD-121); Scouting Squadron 6 USS Charger (AVG-30); USS Intrepid (CV-11); Carrier Division 22; Task Group 77.4 / Task Unit 77.4.1 ("Taffy I"); Carrier Division 11; Carrier Division 3 Task Force 38.1; First Task Fleet; Pacific Fleet Air Force
- Conflicts: World War I World War II
- Awards: Navy Cross; Navy Distinguished Service Medal; Legion of Merit with Combat "V" and gold star

Thomas Lamison Sprague (October 2, 1894 – September 17, 1972) was a vice admiral of the United States Navy, who served during World War II as commander of the aircraft carrier Intrepid and took part in the battles of Guam, Leyte Gulf and Okinawa.

== Naval Academy and World War I ==
Born in Lima, Ohio, Sprague graduated from the United States Naval Academy in 1917 (although no relation to Admiral Clifton "Ziggy" Sprague, the two both attended the Naval Academy, later graduating from the same class). He served aboard the protected cruiser Cleveland assigned to the trans-Atlantic convoy from June 1917 until April 1918 and, after serving on shore duty for a brief period, Sprague assisted in the official commission of the destroyer Montgomery in July. As a member of the ship's anti-submarine patrol, Sprague would eventually come to command Montgomery from January to November 1920.

== Inter-war years ==
After participating in naval flight training at Naval Air Station Pensacola, Sprague served as a staff officer under Pacific Air commander Admiral H.V. Butler from 1921 to 1923. In 1926, Sprague was transferred to the battleship Maryland serving with Observation Squadron 1 for two years before being stationed at the Naval Air Station San Diego in 1928.

Between 1931 and 1936, Sprague served as commander of Scouting Squadron 6, director of the Aeronautical Engine Laboratory at the Naval Aircraft Factory in Philadelphia, and air officer on board the aircraft carrier Saratoga before being reassigned as to Pensacola as superintendent of Naval Air Training from 1937 to 1940.

== World War II ==
Serving as executive officer on board the aircraft carrier Ranger on the Neutrality Patrol in the Atlantic for a year, Sprague helped commission the escort carrier Charger and commanded the vessel during training missions in the Chesapeake from February to December 1942.

After serving staff duty from January to June 1943, Sprague commissioned the aircraft carrier Intrepid in August, and commanded the ship in raids against the Truk and Marshall Islands during the first two months of 1944.

Promoted to rear admiral in June, Sprague commanded Carrier Division 22, which covered the assault on Guam from July–August and Morotai in September. In command of Task Group 77.4 and Task Unit 77.4.1 ("Taffy 1") during the Battle of Leyte Gulf from October 24–25, Sprague briefly commanded Pacific training carriers under Carrier Division 11, before leading Carrier Division 3 off Okinawa from April–June 1945. He commanded Task Force 38.1 during the final air operations against Japan by the war's end.

== Post-war career and death ==
Sprague was named deputy chief, then chief, of the Bureau of Naval Personnel in 1946, serving until his promotion to vice admiral in August 1949. Appointed commander of the Pacific Fleet Air Force in October, Sprague would hold this post until his retirement in April 1952. In 1950, he also commanded the First Task Fleet between the retirement of Vice Adm. Gerald Bogan at the beginning of February and the arrival of Vice Adm. Calvin Durgin in March. He briefly returned to active duty to negotiate with the Philippine government over the status of U.S. air bases in 1956.

Sprague died at Chula Vista, California on September 17, 1972.
