= James D. Hornfischer =

American naval historian (1965–2021)

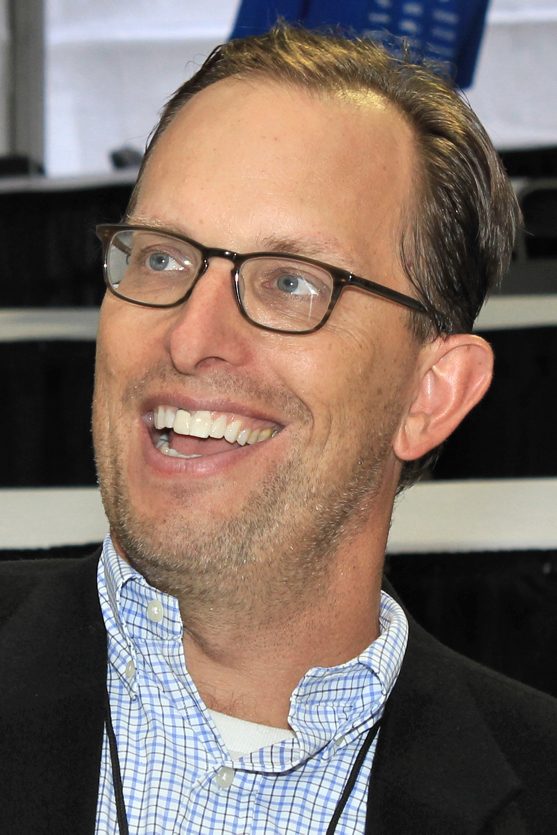
Hornfischer at the 2016 Texas Book Festival

James D. Hornfischer (November 18, 1965 – June 2, 2021) was an American literary agent, author, and naval historian.

A one-time book editor at the publishing company HarperCollins in New York, Hornfischer was later president of Hornfischer Literary Management, a literary agency in Austin, Texas.

== Early life ==
Hornfischer was born in Salem, Massachusetts. He was a 1987 graduate of Colgate University, where he was elected to Phi Beta Kappa and graduated with high honors in German. He received a Juris Doctor degree from the University of Texas School of Law in 2001.

== Professional background ==
Hornfischer, a non-practicing member of the State Bar of Texas, was president of Hornfischer Literary Management, a literary agency in Austin, Texas, that represents authors of nonfiction books in a variety of subject areas, including current affairs, history, politics, biography, business, and popular science, among others. Clients include David Bellavia, James Bradley, HW Brands, Fred Burton, Susannah Charleson, Kim Cross, Steve Forbes, George Friedman, William H. Goetzmann, Don Graham, James L. Haley, Woody Holton, Annie Jacobsen, Alex Kershaw, Governor Rick Perry, Ron Powers, Roy Spence, Mark K. Updegrove, and others. He was a member of the Authors Guild and the Texas Institute of Letters, and served on the advisory board of the Mayborn Literary Nonfiction Conference, sponsored by the Mayborn School of Journalism at the University of North Texas. He wrote for Smithsonian, The Wall Street Journal, and other periodicals. He was a board member of the Naval Historical Foundation.

On 18 May 2021, he was awarded the Navy Distinguished Public Service Award by the Director of the Naval History and Heritage Command (NHHC), RADM Samuel J. Cox, USN-Ret.

On 2 June 2021, he died from glioblastoma in Austin, Texas, at age 55.

== Books ==
- The Last Stand of the Tin Can Sailors: The Extraordinary World War II Story of the U.S. Navy's Finest Hour (Bantam hardcover, 2004; Bantam trade paperback, 2005) ISBN 0-553-80257-7
- Ship of Ghosts: The Story of the USS Houston, FDR's Legendary Lost Cruiser and the Epic Saga of Her Survivors (Bantam hardcover, 2006; Bantam trade paperback, 2007). ISBN 0-553-80390-5
- Neptune's Inferno: The U.S. Navy at Guadalcanal (Bantam hardcover, 2011). ISBN 978-0-553-80670-0
- Service: A Navy SEAL at War with Marcus Luttrell (Little Brown hardcover, 2012). ISBN 978-0-316-18536-3
- The Fleet at Flood Tide: America at Total War in the Pacific, 1944–1945 (Bantam hardcover, October 25, 2016). ISBN 978-0-345-54870-2
- Who Can Hold the Sea: The U.S. Navy in the Cold War 1945–1960 (Bantam hardcover, May 3, 2022). ISBN 978-0-399-17864-1

== Awards ==
- Samuel Eliot Morison Award for Naval Literature from the Naval Order of the United States, for The Last Stand of the Tin Can Sailors
- United States Maritime Literature Award, for Ship of Ghosts
- Commodore John Barry Book Award of the Navy League of the United States, for The Fleet at Flood Tide
- Navy Distinguished Public Service Award
