= List of recipients of the United States Presidential Unit Citation =

This is a list of recipients of the United States Presidential Unit Citation. This list will likely never be a complete list of the units that have been awarded the citation due to the difficulty of finding records in various archives and the recent awards given to units that might not have presently been listed.

== Recipients ==
=== World War II ===
==== Army ====
Unit	Service	Year awarded	Campaign or battle	Notes
26th Cavalry Regiment	U.S. Army	1941	Battle of Damortis/Lingayen Gulf	
Third Battalion, 358th Infantry Regiment, 90th infantry Division	U.S. Army	1944	Mahlman Line	UNIT CITATION – 24 February 1945 Under the provisions of Section IV, Circular 333, War Department, 22 December 1943, and pursuant to the authority contained in 4th Indorsement, Headquarters Third United States Army, File AG 200.6 (5 November 1944) GHMCA-4, dated 14 February 1945, the following unit is cited: The third Battalion, 358th Infantry, is cited for extraordinary heroism in the face of enemy in France. During the period 10 – 12 July 1944, the officers and men of this organization displayed great courage, endurance and dogged determination in the attack through the dense Foret de Mont Castre, France. The position known as the "Mahlman Line" was part of the main enemy defensive line. It consisted of dug-in positions, cunningly camouflaged in the tangled underbrush and other devices that utilized to the fullest the natural defensive qualities of the area. Despite repeated fierce enemy counterattacks, the Battalion relentlessly drove forward and eliminated a battalion of parachute infantry and a company of parachute engineers, both of which were part of the elite 5th German Parachute Division. By the end of the first day the Battalion Commander and 11 of the 17 officers were casualties but the advance had progressed to within 75 yards of the initial objective. The following day the remnants of the three rifle companies, one of which had 20 men, were reorganized into one composite company with a strength of 126 men and commanded by a lieutenant. In a renewed charge the depleted Battalion overran the objective, killed 40 enemy, captured 8 machine guns, bazookas and mortars. On 12 July 1944 as it left the forest the Battalion, retaining its aggressiveness, fought with exceptional daring and great skill and took successive objectives. The Battalion's break through the enemy's main position contributed materially to the Division's advance. The inspiring leadership of its officers and the gallantry displayed by all ranks were in accordance with the highest military tradition. By command of Major General ROOKS:
22nd Infantry Regiment	U.S. Army	1944	Operation Cobra	PRESIDENTIAL UNIT CITATION OF THE 22D INFANTRY REGIMENT The 22d Infantry Regiment is cited for extraordinary heroism and outstanding performance of duty in action in Normandy, France, during the period 26 July to 1 August 1944. The 22d Infantry Regiment was the infantry element of an armored-infantry combat command which successfully effected a breakthrough of the German line of resistance west of St. Lo, forming the St. Gillis-Marigny gap, through which armored-infantry columns surged deep into German held territory. Operating against hardened infantry, artillery and panzer units, this regiment, often riding its accompanying tanks, met and overcame the stiffest German resistance in desperate engagements at St. Gillis, Canisy, le Mesnil Herman, Villebaudon, Moyen, Percy, and Tessy-sur-Vire. The 22d Infantry Regiment, in its first action with an armored division, after a short period of indoctrination, assumed the role of armored infantry with unparalleled success. Throughout the swiftly moving, seven-day operation, the infantry teams kept pace with the tanks, only resting briefly at night to relentlessly press the attack at dawn. Rear echelons fought with enemy groups by-passed in the assault. There was little protection from the heavy artillery which the Germans brought to bear on the American armor. Enemy bombers continually harassed the American troops at night. But in an outstanding performance of duty the 22d Infantry Regiment perfected an infantry-tank team which by the power of its determined fighting spirit became an irresistible force on the battlefield.
Company A, 36th Armored Infantry Regiment, 3rd Armored Division, VII Corps, First Army	U.S. Army	1944	Siegfried Line	GENERAL ORDERS No. 24 WAR DEPARTMENT 6 April 1945 As authorized by Executive Order No. 9396 (sec. I, Bul. 22, WD, 1943), superseding Executive Order No. 9075 (sec. III, Bul. 11, WD, 1942), citation of the following units in General Orders, No. 24, Headquarters 3d Armored Division, 20 February 1945, as approved by the Commanding General, European Theater of Operations, are confirmed under the provisions of section IV, Circular No. 333, War Department, 1943, in the name of the President of the United States as public evidence of deserved honor and distinction. The citations read as follows: Company A, 36th Armored Infantry Regiment is cited for outstanding performance of duty in action during the period 10 to 13 December 1944 in Germany. On 10 December 1944, Company A was assigned as the only infantry company of a task force which launched an attack on Echtz. Aware of the superiority in number of enemy troops which were dug in and heavily fortified, the men and officers of Company A attacked vigorously, and, with great determination, routed the enemy from its defensive positions and secured the village prior to nightfall. On 12 December 1944. Company A, as part of a reconnaissance force, joined with tanks to reconnoiter a small village on the Roer River. The sector assigned to Company A required an advance of 1,500 yards over flat and open terrain and under complete enemy observation from the east bank of the river. Though the company on its left was driven back in its attempt to cross the fire-swept field, the officers and men of Company A, ignoring heavy explosive shells, direct tank fire, and withering automatic-weapons fire and suffering heavy casualties, unhesitatingly advanced across the fire-swept field to reach the edge of the town. With very few leaders remaining and its ranks thinned by casualties, Company A continued to push forward aggressively and successfully captured the village, clearing the approaches to the town in preparation for the advance of another rifle company. The heroic actions and esprit de corps displayed by the officers and men of Company A, 36th Armored Infantry Regiment, though weakened by heavy casualties, are worthy of high praise.
Company C, 36th Armored Infantry Regiment, 3rd Armored Division, VII Corps, First Army	U.S. Army	1944	Siegfried Line	GENERAL ORDERS No. 24 WAR DEPARTMENT 6 April 1945 As authorized by Executive Order No. 9396 (sec. I, Bul. 22, WD, 1943), superseding Executive Order No. 9075 (sec. III, Bul. 11, WD, 1942), citation of the following units in General Orders, No. 24, Headquarters 3d Armored Division, 20 February 1945, as approved by the Commanding General, European Theater of Operations, are confirmed under the provisions of section IV, Circular No. 333, War Department, 1943, in the name of the President of the United States as public evidence of deserved honor and distinction. The citations read as follows: Company C, 36th Armored Infantry Regiment, is cited for outstanding performance of duty in action during the period 10 to 13 December 1944 in Germany. On 10 December 1944, Company C was part of a task force and was in support of the leading tank company in an attack upon Obergeich. When the force came within 600 yards of the village, only four tanks remained in operation because of heavily mined areas and difficult terrain. The men of Company C, without command from their leaders, passed through the tanks and vigorously assaulted enemy positions, thus permitting adjacent units to advance with a minimum of casualties. Despite the loss of all of its officers and 55 men, Company C plunged forward, and, by sheer determination and gallantry, successfully captured its objective. Two days later Company C acted as a reserve force as two battalions of infantry made an attack upon the village of Hoven. Severe casualties were suffered by assaulting elements, and Company C, though weakened by the losses sustained in the previous fighting, was immediately committed to action. Company C moved rapidly across the flat and open terrain, and, in the face of murderous fire from a numerically superior enemy, succeeded in clearing the town of all resistance. The individual courage, valor, and tenacity displayed by the personnel of Company C, 36th Armored Infantry Regiment, in the face of superior odds, are in keeping with the highest traditions of the armed forces and are worthy of emulation.
1st Battalion, 36th Armored Infantry Regiment, 3rd Armored Division, VII Corps, First Army	U.S. Army	1944	Siegfried Line	GENERAL ORDERS No. 54 WAR DEPARTMENT 12 July 1945 As authorized by Executive Order 9396 (sec. I, WD Bul. 22, 1943), superseding Executive Order 9075 (see. III, DW Bul. 11, 1942) citations of the following units in General Orders 54, Headquarters Third Armored Division, 30 April 1945, as approved by the Commanding General, European Theater of Operations, is confirmed under.the provisions of section IV, WD Circular 333, 1943, in the name of the President of the United States as public evidence of deserved honor and distinction. The citations read as follows: The 1st Battalion, 36th Armored Infantry Regiment, is cited for outstanding performance of duty in action against the enemy in Germany during the period 12 to 22 September 1944. The 1st Battalion, 36th Armored Infantry Regiment, on 12 September 1944 was assigned the mission of supporting an armored task force in its drive to smash the defenses of the Siegfried Line. Antitank-obstacles retarded the progress of armor, and the battalion was committed to overrun strongly fortified defensive positions overlooking the obstacles. In 2 days of fierce fighting against a determined enemy the 1st Battalion, 36th Armored Infantry Regiment, succeeded in overpowering enemy defenses and penetrating the first fortified belt of the West Wall. Over difficult terrain overlooking the second fortified belt this fighting force then attacked to force a bridgehead through the second belt of dragon's teeth. Vigorous hostile action was counterbalanced by an insuperable urge to close with and destroy the enemy wherever found. Against tremendous odds the battalion succeeded in establishing a bridgehead and for 3 days repulsed vigorous enemy counterattacks launched against it in an effort to break the battalion's foothold north of the dragon's teeth on critical terrain. On 18 September 1944, after infantry elements on the left and right failed to advance, the 1st Battalion was given the vital mission of withdrawing from its salient and attacking the strongly fortified town of Munsterbusch. Its fighting spirit undimmed, the 1st Battalion withdrew under pressure and launched the assault. The enemy poured deadly fire into its ranks inflicting severe losses on the attackers. The enemy fought savagely which often resulted in hand-to-hand combat. Despite enormous losses incurred in this offensive the 1st Battalion allowed the enemy no respite. Defending the town stubbornly the enemy employed tank, mortar, artillery, and automatic weapons fire and fanatically held their positions until either killed or overpowered by unrelenting pressure. During the period 12 to 22 September 1944 the 1st Battalion demonstrated extraordinary heroism and exhibited gallantry, determination, and esprit de corps in overcoming unusually difficult and hazardous conditions. The unconquerable spirit displayed by the 1st Battalion, 36th Armored Infantry Regiment in attack missions against important objectives made possible more deadly blows against the enemy on German soil.
Medical Section, 3d Battalion, 36th Armored Infantry Regiment, 3rd Armored Division, VII Corps, First Army	U.S. Army	1944	Siegfried Line	GENERAL ORDERS No. 54 WAR DEPARTMENT 12 July 1945 As authorized by Executive Order 9396 (sec. I, WD Bul. 22, 1943), superseding Executive Order 9075 (see. III, DW Bul. 11, 1942) citations of the following units in General Orders 54, Headquarters Third Armored Division, 30 April 1945, as approved by the Commanding General, European Theater of Operations, is confirmed under.the provisions of section IV, WD Circular 333, 1943, in the name of the President of the United States as public evidence of deserved honor and distinction. The citations read as follows: The Medical Section, 3d Battalion, 36th Armored Infantry Regiment, is cited for outstanding performance of duty in action in Germany during the period 17 to 21 September 1944. Throughout this bitter engagement, the Medical Section, 3d Battalion, 36th Armored Infantry Regiment, labored unceasingly despite devastating hostile artillery, mortar, and small-arms fire, administering medical aid and evacuating casualties. Although several members of the section were painfully wounded, they denied themselves treatment or rest until their patients had been cared for. On one occasion, when an adjacent battalion was forced back leaving the aid station unprotected, the members of the section continued their care for the wounded, realizing that to move the patients would have been, in many cases, fatal. Litter squads operated in the face. of intense fire between the aid station and advanced units, evacuating casualties. Aid men moved with foremost assault units, rendering immediate medical treatment to the wounded. The unflinching courage and superb devotion to duty displayed by the members of the Medical Section, 3d Battalion, 36th Armored Infantry Regiment, resulted directly in the saving of many lives, exemplifying the highest traditions of the military service.
Division and 1st Brigade, 101st Airborne Division	U.S. Army	1944	Normandy	
Division and 1st Brigade, 101st Airborne Division (less 2nd Battalion, 401st Glider Infantry Regiment) and with the following attached units: 501st Parachute Infantry Regiment, 506th Parachute Infantry Regiment; 463rd Parachute Field Artillery Battalion; Counterintelligence Detachment, 101st Airborne Division; Order of Battle Detachment Number 5; Military Intelligence Interpreter Team Number 410; Photo Interpreter Teams Number 9 & 81; Prisoner of War Interrogation Teams Number 1, 9, & 87; Third Auxiliary Surgical Group, Team Number 3; 969th Field Artillery Battalion; 755th Field Artillery Battalion; 705th Field Artillery Battalion; Combat Command B, 10th Armored Division including: Headquarters and Headquarters Company, Combat Command B, 10th Armored Division; 3rd Tank Battalion (less Company C); 20th Armored Infantry Battalion (less Company A); 54th Armored Infantry Battalion (less Company A and C); 420th Armored Field Artillery Battalion; Troop D, 90th Cavalry Reconnaissance Squadron (Mechanized); Company C, 609th Tank Destroyer Battalion (less 1st Platoon; with 2nd Platoon Reconnaissance Company attached); Battery B, 796th Antiaircraft Artillery Automatic Weapons Battalion; Company C, 55th Armored Engineer Battalion; Company C, 21st Tank Battalion; Reserve Command, 9th Armored Division including: Headquarters Reserve Command, 9th Armored Division; Headquarters and Headquarters Company, 12th Armored Group; 2nd Tank Battalion; 52nd Armored Infantry Battalion; 73rd Armored Field Artillery Battalion; Company C, 9th Armored Engineer Battalion; Company C, 811th Tank Destroyer Battalion; Battery C, 482nd Antiaircraft Artillery Automatic Weapons Battalion (Self-Propelled); 2nd Battalion, 378th Infantry Regiment, 95th Infantry Division, 3rd Army.	U.S. Army	1945	Battle of Bastogne	CITADEL OF BASTOGNE As authorized by Executive Order 9396 (sec. I, Bul. 22, WD, 1943), superseding Executive Order 9075 (sec. III, WD Bul, 11, 1942), the following unit is cited by the War Department under the provisions of section IV, Circular No. 333, War Department, 1943 in the name of the President of the United States as public evidence of deserved honor and distinction. The citation reads as follows: 101st Airborne Division (less 2nd Battalion, 401st Glider Infantry Regiment), with the following-attached units: 501st Parachute Infantry Regiment; 506th Parachute Infantry Regiment; 463rd Parachute Field Artillery Battalion; Counterintelligence Detachment, 101st Airborne Division; Order of Battle Detachment Number 5; Military Intelligence Interpreter Team Number 410; Photo Interpreter Teams Number 9 & 81; Prisoner of War Interrogation Teams Number 1, 9, & 87; Third Auxiliary Surgical Group, Team Number 3; 969th Field Artillery Battalion; 755th Field Artillery Battalion; 705th Field Artillery Battalion; Combat Command B, 10th Armored Division including: Headquarters and Headquarters Company, Combat Command B, 10th Armored Division; 3rd Tank Battalion (less Company C); 20th Armored Infantry Battalion (less Company A); 54th Armored Infantry Battalion (less Company A and C); 420th Armored Field Artillery Battalion; Troop D, 90th Cavalry Reconnaissance Squadron (Mechanized); Company C, 609th Tank Destroyer Battalion (less 1st Platoon; with 2nd Platoon Reconnaissance Company attached); Battery B, 796th Antiaircraft Artillery Automatic Weapons Battalion; Company C, 55th Armored Engineer Battalion; Company C, 21st Tank Battalion; Reserve Command, 9th Armored Division including: Headquarters Reserve Command, 9th Armored Division; Headquarters and Headquarters Company, 12th Armored Group; 2nd Tank Battalion; 52nd Armored Infantry Battalion; 73rd Armored Field Artillery Battalion; Company C, 9th Armored Engineer Battalion; Company C, 811th Tank Destroyer Battalion; Battery C, 482nd Antiaircraft Artillery Automatic Weapons Battalion (Self-Propelled); 2nd Battalion, 378th Infantry Regiment, 95th Infantry Division, 3rd Army These units distinguished themselves in combat against powerful and aggressive enemy forces composed of elements of 8 German divisions during the period from 18 December to 27 December 1944 by extraordinary heroism and gallantry in defense of the key communications center of Bastogne, Belgium. Essential to a large scale exploitation of his break-through into Belgium and northern Luxembourg, the enemy attempted to seize Bastogne by attacking constantly and savagely with the best of his armor and infantry. Without benefit of prepared defenses, facing almost overwhelming odds and with very limited and fast dwindling supplies, these units maintained a high combat morale and an impenetrable defense, despite extremely heavy bombing, intense artillery fire, and constant attacks from infantry and armor on all sides of their completely cut off and encircled position. This masterful and grimly determined defense denied the enemy even momentary success in an operation for which he paid dearly in men, material, and eventually morale. The outstanding courage and resourcefulness and undaunted determination of this gallant force is in keeping with the highest traditions of the service. [General Orders No. 17, War Department, 13 March 1945.]
Easy Company, 117th Regiment, 30th Infantry Division	U.S. Army	1944	Battle of Aachen	General Order 91, Headquarters 30th Infantry Division, Office of the Commanding General, 2 May 1945: Company E, 117th Infantry Regiment, United States Army, is cited for outstanding performance of duty in action against the enemy on 16 October 1944, in Germany. Company E was given the mission of making a diversionary attack to weaken enemy pressure along a sector in which the main effort was to be made by another Regiment for the purpose of completing the encirclement of Aachen, Germany. Enemy observation was excellent and the nature of the terrain made the attack extremely hazardous. Enemy fire was exceptionally heavy and caused many casualties within the company. Displaying unexcelled personal courage, the company launched five attacks against the numerically superior enemy and though control and direction were extremely difficult due to the unfavorable terrain and heavy enemy fire, their attacks succeeded in diverting much of the enemy's fire from the main effort, although at the cost of heavy casualties to the company. The individual heroism exhibited in this engagement reflects great credit on each participant and is in keeping with the high traditions of the Military Service.
3rd Infantry Division	U.S. Army	1945	Colmar Pocket	War Department General Orders Number 44, 6 June 1945: As authorized by Executive Order 9396 (sec. I, WD Bul. 22, 1943), superseding Executive Order 9075 (sec. III, WD Bul, 11, 1942), the following unit is cited by the War Department for outstanding performance of duty in action during the period indicated under provisions of section IV, WD Circular 333, 1943, In the name of the President of the United States as public evidence of deserved honor and distinction. The citation reads as follows: The 3rd Infantry Division with the following-attached units: 254 Infantry Regiment, 99th Chemical Battalion, 168th Chemical Smoke Generator Company, 441st Antiaircraft Artillery Automatic Weapons Battalion, 601st Tank Destroyer Battalion (SP), 756th Tank Battalion, IPW Team 183, and the 2831st Engineer (C) Battalion fighting incessantly, from 22 January-6 February 1945, in heavy snow storms, through enemy-infested marshes and woods, and over a flat plain crisscrossed by numerous small canals, irrigation ditches, and unfordable streams, terrain ideally suited to the defense, breached the German defense wall on the northern perimeter of the Colmar bridgehead and drove forward to isolate Colmar from the Rhine. Crossing the Fecht River from Guemar, Alsace, by stealth during the late hours of darkness of 22 January, the assault elements fought their way forward against mounting resistance. Reaching the Ill River, a bridge was thrown across but collapsed before armor could pass to the support of two battalions of the 80th Infantry on the far side. Isolated and attacked by a full German Panzer brigade, outnumbered and outgunned, these valiant troops were forced back yard by yard. Wave after wave of armor and infantry was hurled against them but despite hopeless odds the regiment held tenaciously to its bridgehead. Driving forward in knee-deep snow, which masked acres of densely sown mines, the 3d Infantry Division fought from house to house and street to street in the fortress towns of the Alsatian Plain. Under furious concentrations of supporting fire, assault troops crossed the Colmar Canal in rubber boats during the night of 29 January. Driving relentlessly forward, six towns were captured within eight hours, 500 casualties inflicted on the enemy during the day, and large quantities of booty seized. Slashing through to the Rhone-Rhine Canal, the garrison at Colmar was cut off and the fall of the city assured. Shifting the direction of attack, the division moved south between the Rhone-Rhine Canal and the Rhine toward Neuf Brisach and the Brisach Bridge. Synchronizing the attacks, the bridge was seized and Neuf Brisach captured by crossing the protecting moat and scaling the medieval walls by ladder. In one of the hardest fought and bloodiest campaigns of the war, the 3d Infantry Division annihilated three enemy divisions, partially destroyed three others, captured over 4,000 prisoners, and inflicted more than 7,500 casualties on the enemy.
32nd Infantry Division	U.S. Army	1943	Kokoda Track campaign, Battle of Buna-Gona	General Orders Number 21, War Department, 6 May 1943: "When (a) bold and aggressive enemy invaded Papua in strength, the combined action of ground and air units of these forces, in association with Allied units, checked the hostile advance, drove the enemy back to the seacoast and in a series of actions against a highly organized defensive zone, utterly destroyed him. Ground combat forces, operating over roadless jungle-covered mountains and swamps, demonstrated their courage and resourcefulness in closing with an enemy who took every advantage of the nearly impassable terrain. Air forces, by repeatedly attacking the enemy ground forces and installations, by destroying his convoys attempting reinforcement and supply, and by transporting ground forces and supplies to areas for which land routes were non-existent and sea routes slow and hazardous, made possible the success of the ground operations. Service units, operating far forward of their normal positions and at times in advance of ground combat elements, built landing fields in the jungle, established and operated supply points, and provided for the hospitalization and evacuation of the wounded and sick. The courage, spirit, and devotion to duty of all elements of the command made possible the complete victory attained."
2nd Battalion, 274th Infantry Regiment, 70th Infantry Division	U.S. Army	1945	Ardennes-Alsace	Fought units of 6th SS Mountain Division on 5–7 January which resulted in the liberation of Wingen
1st Battalion, 309th Infantry Regiment, 78th Infantry Division	U.S. Army		Germany	SCHWAMMENAUEL DAM inscription
1st Battalion,
2nd Battalion, 311th Infantry Regiment, 78th Infantry Division	U.S. Army	1945	Kesternich (Siegfried Line)	
Intelligence and Reconnaissance Platoon, 394th Infantry Regiment, 99th Infantry Division	U.S. Army	1945	Battle of the Bulge	On October 26, 1981, after considerably lobbying and letter-writing by Lt. Lyle Bouck, members of the unit were finally decorated. Fourteen of the 18 members were present. Secretary of the Army John O. Marsh presented the recognition. The Intelligence and Reconnaissance Platoon, 394th Infantry Regiment, 99th Infantry Division, distinguished itself by extraordinary heroism, in action against enemy forces on 16 December 1944 near Lanzerath. Belgium. The German Ardennes Offensive that began the Battle of the Bulge was directed initially against a small sector defended by the Intelligence and Reconnaissance Platoon. Following a two-hour artillery barrage, enemy forces of at least battalion strength launched three separate frontal attacks against the small Intelligence and Reconnaissance Platoon of 18 men. Each attack was successfully repelled by the platoon. The platoon position was becoming untenable as casualties mounted and ammunition was nearly exhausted. Plans were made to break contact with the enemy and withdraw under cover of darkness. Before this could be accomplished, a fourth enemy attack finally overran the position and the platoon was captured at bayonet point. Although greatly outnumbered, through numerous feats of valor and an aggressive and deceptive defense of their position, the platoon inflicted heavy casualties on the enemy forces and successfully delayed for nearly 24 hours a major spearhead of the attacking German forces. Their valorous actions provided crucial time for the American forces to prepare to defend against the massive German offensive. The extraordinary gallantry, determination and esprit de corps of the Intelligence and Reconnaissance Platoon in close combat against a numerically superior enemy force are in keeping with the highest traditions of the United States Army and reflect great credit upon the Unit and the Armed Forces of the United States.
26th Infantry Division	U.S. Army	1945	Ardennes-Alsace	
Combat Command "B", 7th Armored Division	U.S. Army	1948	St. Vith (Ardennes Campaign)	Dept. of the Army GO No. 48, dated 12 July 1948: "Combat Command B. 7th Armored Division, composed of the following units: Headquarters and Headquarters Company; 17th Tank Battalion; 31st Tank Battalion; 23d Armored Infantry Battalion; 38th Armored Infantry Battalion; 87th Cavalry Reconnaissance Squadron Mechanized (less Troop D); 275th Armored Field Artillery Battalion; 434th Armored Field Artillery Battalion; 965th Field Artillery Battalion; 81st Engineer Combat Battalion (106th Infantry Division); 168th Engineer Combat Battalion; 1st Platoon, Company F, 423d Infantry Regiment (amended from 3rd Platoon in Defense Department Permanent Order #032-01, dated 1 February 1999); Company B, 33d Armored Engineer Battalion; and Company A, 814th Tank Destroyer Battalion (SP), is cited for outstanding performance of duty in action from 17 to 23 December 1944, inclusive, at St. Vith, Belgium. Combat Command B, 7th Armored Division, was subjected to repeated tank and infantry attacks, which grew in intensity as the German forces attempted to destroy the stubborn defenses that were denying to them the use of the key communication center at St. Vith. By the second day, the flanks were constantly threatened by enemy forces that had bypassed the St. Vith area and pushed far to the rear in an effort to encircle the command east of the Salm River. The attacking forces were repeatedly thrown back by the gallant troops who rose from their fox holes and fought in fierce hand-to-hand combat to stop the penetrations and inflict heavy losses on the numerically superior foe. As the command continued to deny the important St. Vith highway and railroad center to the Germans, the entire offensive lost its initial impetus and their supply columns became immobilized. By 21 December, the German timetable was so disrupted that the enemy was forced to divert a corps to the capture of St. Vith. Under extreme pressure from overwhelming forces, this command, which for 6 days had held the St. Vith area so gallantly, was ordered to withdraw west of the Salm River. By their epic stand, without prepared defenses and despite heavy casualties, Combat Command B,. 7th Armored Division inflicted crippling losses and imposed great delay upon the enemy by a masterful and grimly determined defense in keeping with the highest traditions of the Army of the United States."
551st Parachute Infantry Battalion of the 82nd Airborne Division	U.S. Army	1944	Battle of the Bulge, Rochelinval, Belgium	for "exceptional heroism" at the beginning of the American counteroffensive in the Ardennes, Belgium, noting the "heroic attack and seizure of the critical, heavily fortified, regimental German position" of Rochelinval on the Salm River. A separate battalion attached to the 82nd Airborne Division, the 551st began its grueling days as the Division's spearhead by successfully executing a raid on advanced German positions at Noirfontaine on 27 and 28 December 1944, delivering to XVIII Airborne Corps vital intelligence for the Allied counteroffensive soon to come. On 3 January 1945, the 551st from the division's line of departure at Basse Bodeux attacked against great odds and secured the imposing ridge of Herispehe. The next day, January 8, Hitler ordered the German Army's first pullback from the Battle of the Bulge. In fighting a numerically superior foe with dominant high ground advantage, the 551st lost over four-fifths of its men, including the death of its inspirational commander, Lieutenant Colonel Wood Joerg, as he led the last attack. The battalion accounted for 400 German dead, and took over 300 prisoners. The 551st Parachute Infantry Battalion fought with a tenacity and fervor that was extraordinary. In what United States Army historian Charles MacDonald called "the greatest battle ever fought by the United States Army," the 551st demonstrated the very best of the Army tradition of performance of duty in spite of great sacrifice and against all odds. (Awarded on February 23, 2001, by U.S. Army Chief of Staff Gen. Eric K. Shinseki during an official ceremony at the Pentagon.)
21st Tank Battalion, Combat Command B, 10th Armored Division	U.S. Army	1944	Battle of Bastogne	On December 18, 1944, the 10th's charge across Europe was halted due to the Ardennes Offensive. The 10th Armored Division executed a 90-degree turn and rushed 75 miles into the German onslaught. Combat Command B were sent directly into Bastogne with orders to hold. For over eight hours CCB held Bastogne alone, against eight German Divisions. When the 101 Airborne Division arrived both military outfits were surrounded and trapped. However CCB and the 101 Airborne Division maintained a defensive posture and held until the German offensive burned out several days later. At the Conclusion of the battle, the 21st Tank Battalion was awarded the Presidential Unit Citation for their extraordinary heroism from December 17, to December 27, 1944 Battle of the Bulge.
Company "A", 612th Tank Destroyer Battalion	U.S. Army	December 12–29, 1944	Hofen, Germany Battle of the Bulge	During the period of 12 December 1944 to 29 December 1944 in the vicinity of Höfen, Germany, Company A, 612th Tank Destroyer Battalion distinguished itself by exhibiting outstanding courage and superior heroism in the presence of the enemy. The officers and men of Company A, 612th Tank Destroyer Battalion, by spirited arid out-standing aggressiveness, were successful in preventing a breakthrough by the enemy in the sector occupied by the 3rd Battalion of the 395th Infantry Regiment. During the entire action the personnel of Company A, 612th Tank Destroyer Battalion were employed in the role of infantry, one for which they were not trained nor to which assigned, fighting with the courage and spirit of infantrymen and being responsible for, the capture of many enemy personnel and enemy materiel as well as the killing of numerous Germans. Their outstanding courage, bravery and discipline exhibited to all that this was a superior fighting unit and was instrumental in resisting the northern arm of the German Pincer aimed for Eupen, Belgium through Monschau, Germany. Had the enemy offensive successfully overrun the positions of Company A 612th Tank Destroyer Battalion, the entire northern flank of the First United States Army would have been endangered, and the major supply depots in the vicinity of Eupen and Verviers threatened.
3rd Battalion, 395th Infantry Regiment, 99th Infantry Division	U.S. Army		Hofen, Germany Battle of the Bulge	"...the Third Battalion, 395th Infantry, was assigned the mission of holding the Monschau-Eupen-Liege Road. For four successive days, the battalion held this sector against combined German tank and infantry attacks, launched with fanatical determination and supported by heavy artillery. No reserves were available… and the situation was desperate. On at least six different occasions, the battalion was forced to place artillery concentrations dangerously close to its own positions in order to repulse penetrations and restore its lines… The enemy artillery was so intense that communications were generally out. The men carried out missions without orders when their positions were penetrated or infiltrated. They killed Germans coming at them from the front, flanks, and rear. Outnumbered five to one, they inflicted casualties in the ratio of 18 to one. With ammunition supplies dwindling rapidly, the men obtained German weapons and utilized ammunition obtained from casualties to drive off the persistent foe. Despite fatigue, constant enemy shelling, and ever-increasing enemy pressure, the Third Battalion guarded a 6000-yard front and destroyed 75 percent of three German infantry regiments"
761st Tank Battalion	U.S. Army	1978	ETO, World War II	General Order Number 5
1st Battalion, 43rd Air Defense Artillery Regiment	U.S. Army		Guadalcanal	Army citation
146th Engineer (Combat) Battalion	U.S. Army	1944	Operation Overlord	Landed H+03 minutes, Omaha Beach, D-Day, June 6, 1944
695th Armored Field Artillery Battalion	U.S. Army	1945		Invasion behind enemy lines and capture of the French city Metz.
34th Field Artillery	U.S. Army	1943	North Africa	
51st Combat Engineer Battalion	U.S. Army	1945	Ardennes	Defense of several key Belgian cities against Kampfgruppe Peiper between December 17–22, 1944.
1st Battalion, 307th Infantry Regiment of the 77th Infantry Division	U.S. Army	1945	Okinawa, le Shima	"For assaulting, capturing and securing The Escarpment, a heavily fortified coral rock fortress which was the key to the famed Japanese Shuri defensive position on Okinawa, during the period 30 April to 5 May 1945, and making possible a general advance by all elements of the command."
505th Parachute Infantry Regiment of the 82nd Airborne Division	U.S. Army	1944	D-Day – Normandy	for action at Sainte-Mère-Église
First Battalion, 504th Parachute Infantry Regiment (less Company "A") of the 82nd Airborne Division	U.S. Army	1945	Operation Market Garden – Cheneux, Belgium	HEADQUARTERS 82D AIRBORNE DIVISION Office of the Division Commander A.P.O. 469, U.S. Army, 23 March 1945 GENERAL ORDERS UNIT CITATION NUMBER 43 The First Battalion, 504th Parachute Infantry (less Company "A") has been cited by the Commanding General, First United States Army, for outstanding performance of duty in action against the enemy. The citation is as follows: The First Battalion, 504th Parachute Infantry (less Company "A") is cited for outstanding performance of duty in action against the enemy on 20–21 December 1944, at Cheneux, Belgium. This force was ordered to seize and occupy the town which is situated on hilly terrain and was defended by a heavily reinforced battalion of armored SS Troops supported by a Mark VI tank, numerous machine guns, SP 20 mm guns, SP 77 mm guns, and 105 mm howitzers. The position was further defended in depth by armored halftracks mounting triple 20 mm cannon and SP 81mm mortars. The battalion attacked Cheneux in echelons of assault waves and stormed the strongly emplaced enemy through the heavy fire of 20 mm cannon, machine gun, mortar and small arms. The first three waves suffered severe losses as they charged across 400 yards of open fields fenced with barbed wire. Despite heavy losses, these airborne soldiers kept going with grim determination, each succeeding wave getting closer until the enemy and his armored vehicles and cannon were finally overwhelmed in fierce hand-to-hand combat. When ammunition ran low the troopers drove the enemy from almost impregnable positions with bayonets and clubbed rifles. The stubborn enemy was completely routed from his perimeter defenses and the attack continued until a portion of Cheneux was seized, where reorganization was effected and preparations made for a counter-attack. At dawn, the enemy laid down a heavy artillery preparation, then launched five successive counter-attacks through the day. All of these were repelled and at dusk this undaunted force continued the attack and drove the Germans from the town and nearby high ground. In this battle for CHENEUX, the First Battalion of the 504th Parachute Infantry (less Company "A"), destroyed five companies of German SS Armored troops and large quantities of artillery, vehicles and one Mark VI tank. They sealed a trap for thirty tanks and ninety-five vehicles which were eventually completely destroyed. This airborne force sustained heavy casualties in the engagement, but, despite these losses and the fanatical ferocity with which the enemy defended key positions, it prevailed in a most outstanding manner through superb discipline, skill and teamwork. The superior fortitude, unparalleled élan and individual feats of gallantry and high courage on the part of every man and officer reflect credit on the traditions of the airborne forces of the United States Army.
Company "A", 504th Parachute Infantry Regiment of the 82nd Airborne Division	U.S. Army	1945	Co. A for crossing Rhine River at Hitdorf, Germany on 6 April 1945	Company "A" 504th Parachute Infantry, is cited for outstanding performance of duty in the armed conflict against the enemy in Germany on 6–7 April 1945. This company crossed the Rhine River at 02–30 hours 6 April 1945, and seized the mile-long town of Hitdorf on the east shore with the mission of providing a base for further patrolling and to cause the German High Command to commit disproportionate forces against them in the belief that it was to be a major river crossing. The enemy immediately counter-attacked, but the assault groups were met with great vigor and virtually destroyed to a man. Apparently under the impression that a strong American bridgehead had been established overnight, the Germans assembled and directed a considerable portion of two divisions to the mission of containing and annihilating the formidable thrust. In mid-afternoon the entire area was subjected to a withering and devastating artillery barrage for two hours after which counter-attacking forces in overwhelming strength with tank support assaulted the defending troopers from every direction and penetrated to the heart of the town. The troopers of Company A doggedly stood their ground, fought at close quarters, and at point blank range and inflicted terrible casualties on the masses of the enemy. Fighting with relentless ferocity throughout the afternoon and night, this gallant company held its ground and carried out its mission until it was finally ordered to withdraw to the west bank of the Rhine on the night of 6–7 April. Fighting was bitter and at close quarters. The German armor committed was destroyed with hand weapons, most of the troopers using captured German panzerfausts. The company fought its way back step by step during the hours of darkness to their boats. The courageous and skillful efforts of the officers and men of this brave group, although outnumbered numerically at least eight to one, is reflected in the total number of casualties inflicted on the German forces during the day's fighting . Eighty prisoners were taken and evacuated and conservative estimates indicate that 150 of the enemy were killed and 250 wounded. The conduct of Company A reflects great credit on the Airborne Forces of the United States Army.
505th Parachute Infantry Regiment of the 82nd Airborne Division	U.S. Army	1944	Operation Market Garden – Groesbeek, the Netherlands	
96th Infantry Division	U.S. Army	2001	Okinawa	The 96th Infantry Division and attached units distinguished themselves during the period 1 April 1945 to 30 June 1945, by extraordinary heroism and gallantry in action against the enemy in the conquest of Okinawa, Ryukyu Islands, Japan. On 1 April 1945 the 96th Infantry Division made an assault landing on the Hagushi beaches of Okinawa and within three days overcame all resistance in the large Sunabe Hill mass which dominated the XXIV Corps' landing beaches. The division then immediately attacked rapidly and skillfully south down the western half of the island, overrunning and destroying or driving in enemy outpost lines and strong points guarding the approaches to the main defense hub at Shuri. By 7 April, the division had penetrated the main outer ring. On 9 April, the division initiated a series of attacks against the powerful Japanese defense position at Kakazu Ridge. It was necessary to dig, blast and burn or bury forever the fanatical enemy defenders. By 15 April, the division had gained control of dominant portions of the ridge. On 16 April, the division became an interior division when a third division entered the line on its right flank. It continued its day after day assaults. Tombstone Hill was seized. Tanabaru and Maeda escarpments were captured. Needle Rock Hill 153 and the Gate were all taken. On 1 May, the division was withdrawn for nine days of rest and for reception and assimilation of replacements totaling over 4,000. On 9 May, the division reentered the lines on the left (east) bank, and began a series of bitter, bloody, hand-to-hand assaults designed to wrest from the Japanese Conical Hill, the vital key to the eastern section of the Shuri battle position. The desperate defenders struck back with all the fire and manpower at their command. Concentrations of artillery and medium and heavy mortar fire were placed upon our lines in durations previously unknown in the Pacific War. By 21 May, the crest and eastern slopes of Conical Hill had been captured, opening an envelopment route to turn Shuri. To the west of Conical Hill, the division captured Sugar Hill and broke through the Shuri Line to within 200 yards of the Nahi-Shuri-Yonabaru Road, the enemy's innermost and essential communication line. Loss of Conical Hill doomed the Shuri position, and the enemy withdrew, shortly after its fall, to final positions along the south tip of the island. The division continued its pursuit of the retreating enemy. On the final enemy positions on the Yuza-Yaeju-Dake escarpments, the two highest hills were in the zone of the 96th Division. The division assaulted heroically and with a fury that could not be stopped, using the same hand-to-hand, digging, blasting burning assaults required in earlier engagements. The 96th Division ended its portion of the organized fighting as it began it, closing to bayonet range with a gallantry, heroism and determination to win which carried its attacks forward despite terrible and crippling casualties and physical discomforts almost beyond human endurance. The division killed a total of 37,763 of the enemy in 73 days of fighting. Its own battle losses totaled 7,294, including 1,504 killed. The brilliant victories achieved by the 96th Division on Okinawa contributed greatly to the defeat of the large enemy garrison. The esprit, heroism, and continued demonstrations of raw courage throughout the battle exemplified the highest traditions of the military service.
2nd Battalion and one platoon of Company A, 749th Tank Battalion and one platoon of Company A, 776th Tank Destroyer Battalion of the 44th Infantry Division (United States)	U.S. Army	1945	France	Defensive action starting on December 31, 1944, against the German offensive Operation Nordwind in Rimling, France.
503rd Regimental Combat Team	U.S. Army	1945	Battle of Corregidor (1945)	Liberation the island of Corregidor in Manila Bay, 16–26 February.
222nd Infantry Regiment	U.S. Army	2001	Alsace	24 & 25 January 1945 withstood repeated attacks from three enemy divisions
Third Platoon, Company C of the 614th Tank Destroyer Battalion	U.S. Army	1945	Alsace	14 December 1944 Set up their guns in full view of the enemy, acting as a decoy so other units could attack and take the town of Climback, France
5307th Composite Unit ("Merrill's Marauders")	U.S. Army	1966	northern Burma	
601st Tank Destroyer Battalion	U.S. Army	1942	Battle of El Guettar	23 March 1942 broke up an attack by strong elements of the 10th Panzer Division, destroying 37 tanks and receiving the Presidential Unit Citation. This has the interesting distinction of being the only time a battalion would fight in the way envisaged by the original "tank destroyer" concept, as an organized independent unit opposing an armored force in open terrain. Received a second Presidential Unit Citation for heavy action in the Colmar Pocket, destroying 18 tanks.
3rd Battalion, 351st Infantry Regiment, 88th Infantry Division	U.S. Army	1944		9 July to 13 July 1944 – Five days of heavy combat; 425 prisoners taken; 250 enemy killed or wounded.
100th Infantry Battalion	U.S. Army	1944	Belvedere and Sassetta, Italy	War Department General Orders 66, 15 August 1944: 26 and 27 June 1944 – The stubborn desire of the men to close with a numerically superior enemy and the rapidity with which they fought enabled the 100th Infantry Battalion to destroy completely the right flank positions of a German army, killing at least 178 Germans, wounding approximately 20, capturing 73, and forcing the remainder of a completely disrupted battalion to surrender approximately 10 kilometers of ground. In addition, large quantities of enemy weapons, vehicles, and equipment were either captured or destroyed.
100th Infantry Battalion	U.S. Army	1944	Bruyeres, Biffontaine, and in the Foret Domaniale de Champ, France	War Department General Orders 78, 12 September 1945: 15 to 30 October 1944 – The 100th Battalion was again committed to the attack. Going to the rescue of the "lost battalion", 141st Infantry Regiment, it fought without respite for 4 days against a fanatical enemy that was determined to keep the "lost battalion" isolated and force its surrender. On the fourth day, although exhausted and reduced through casualties to about half its normal strength, the battalion fought doggedly forward against strong enemy small-arms and mortar fire until it contacted the isolated unit.
442 Regimental Combat Team	U.S. Army	1945	Serravezza, Carrara, and Fosdinovo, Italy	War Department General Orders 34, 10 April 1946, as amended by War Department General Orders 106, 20 September 1946: 5 to 14 April 1945 – It accomplished the mission of creating a diversion along the Ligurian Coast, which served as a feint for the subsequent break-through of the Fifth Army forces into Bologna and the Po Valley. The successful accomplishment of this mission turned a diversionary action into a full scale and victorious offensive, which played an important part in the dual destruction of the German armies in Italy.
2nd Battalion, 442 Regimental Combat Team	U.S. Army	1944–1945	Bruyeres, France; Biffontaine, France; and Massa, Italy	War Department General Orders 83, 6 August 1946: 19 October 1944, 28 and 29 October 1944, 6 to 10 April 1945 – The 2d Battalion executed a brilliant tactical operation in capturing Hill 503, to expedite the forward movement beyond Bruyeres, France and to erase the German threat from the rear. On 28 October 1944, the 2d Battalion secured its objective in a 2-day operation, which eliminated a threat to the flanks of two American divisions. In the face of intense enemy barrages and numerous counterattacks, the infantrymen of this battalion fought their way through difficult jungle-like terrain in freezing weather and completely encircled the enemy. Maintaining its admirable record of achievement in the vicinity of Massa, Italy the 2nd Battalion smashed through and exploited the strong Green Line on the Ligurian Coast. Surging over formidable heights through strong resistance, the 2nd Battalion, in 5 days of continuous, heavy fighting, captured a series of objectives to pave the way for the entry into the important communications centers of Massa and Carrara, Italy, without opposition. In this operation, the 2nd Battalion accounted for more than 200 Germans and captured or destroyed large quantities of enemy material.
3rd Battalion, 442 Regimental Combat Team	U.S. Army	1944	Biffontaine, France	War Department General Orders 68, 14 August 1945: 27 to 30 October 1944 – One of the battalions of another unit which had been advancing deep into enemy territory beyond the town of Biffontaine was suddenly surrounded by the enemy, and separated from all friendly units by an enemy force estimated at 700 men. The mission of the 3rd Battalion was to attack abreast with the 100th Battalion and four other battalions and relieve the entrapped unit. Though seriously depleted in manpower, the battalion hurled back two determined enemy counterattacks, and after reducing a heavily mined roadblock finally established contact with the besieged battalion.
Companies F and L, 442 Regimental Combat Team	U.S. Army	1944	Belmont, France	War Department General Orders 14, 4 March 1945: 21 October 1944 – Companies F and L, 442nd Regimental Combat Team, designated the O'Connor Task Force, launched an attack down the north slope of the wooded ridge, Foret de Belmont. In destroying the enemy main line of resistance and advancing the divisional front lines by approximately 2,000 meters, the task force captured 56 prisoners, killed 80 of the enemy, and captured considerable quantifies of enemy material and equipment.
232d Engineer Combat Company (then attached to the 111th Engineer Combat Battalion), 36th Infantry Division	U.S. Army	1944	Bruyeres, France	War Department General Orders 56, 17 June 1946: 23 October to 11 November 1944 – Even though the engineers sustained 57 casualties in dead and wounded, they captured 27 German prisoners and killed many more as they worked. Almost continuous rain and snow made their task more difficult, and yet by sheer determination and grit, these men accomplished this magnificent feat of engineering. Without this road, the division operation could not have succeeded and it is due to the extraordinary achievement of the 11th Engineer Combat Battalion with the 232d Engineer Combat Company (attached) that the 36th Division was able to outflank the enemy forces in the Laveline-Corcieux Valley and pursue a disorganized enemy to the banks of the Meurthe River.
254th Engineer Combat Battalion	U.S. Army	1945	Battle of the Bulge	General Orders No. 32, War Department, Washington D.C., 23 April 1945: The 254th Engineer Combat Battalion is cited for extraordinary heroism in action against an armed enemy on 17 December 1944 in Belgium. Early in the morning of 17 December 1944, the battalion was ordered to take up a defensive position on the corp's right flank. Although armed only with small arms, machine guns, and rocket launchers, and completely unsupported, the battalion successfully resisted several vicious attacks by armored infantry and tanks (German 2nd SS Panzer Div). When finally overrun physically by enemy tanks, the battalion continued its determined and heroic resistance from successive positions for a period of 9 hours before relief finally arrived (by elements of American 1st Inf Div that moved up from a rest area). This gallant and courageous action enabled successful measures to be taken to secure the safety of the corp's right flank, permitted the evacuation of large stores of gasoline and rations sorely needed by the enemy, and denied him the use of three vital routes of approach. The determination, heroism, and esprit de corps displayed by the individual officers and men of the battalion in this successful action against a powerful enemy armored force, despite severe losses, prevented the enemy from penetrating the corp's rear areas and contributed materially to the ultimate failure of his counterattack. It reflects great credit on the 254th Engineer Combat Battalion and is in keeping with the finest traditions of the military service.
4th Armored Division	U.S. Army	1945	Ardennes	22 December 1944 – 27 March 1945; WD GO 54, 1945
30th Infantry Division	U.S. Army	2020	Mortain, France	Statement from the President, Washington D.C., 17 March 2020: At my direction, the United States Army will award the Presidential Unit Citation to the 30th Infantry Division. More than 75 years ago, Soldiers of the 30th Infantry Division slept in their foxholes after hastily taking defensive positions around the small town of Mortain, France. They woke to find themselves under attack by an entire German Panzer Corps. Through this assault, Adolf Hitler gambled to keep American forces from breaking out of the Normandy beachhead and into the open countryside. The Nazi plan required the Panzer forces to cut through the 30th Infantry Division en route to the sea. However, the actions of the 30th Infantry Division would prove to be decisive in blunting this attack. Nicknamed the "Old Hickory Division" because its Soldiers hailed from National Guard units from North and South Carolina, Tennessee, and Georgia – all States closely associated with President Andrew Jackson – the 30th Division Soldiers proved as tough as their unit's namesake. The situation they faced on August 6, 1944, was dire. They found themselves confronted by overwhelming enemy armor, and the German Panzers broke through their lines. The Old Hickory Division, however, did not stop fighting. It pressed its cooks, clerks, and drivers into service as riflemen. The Division's artillery protected its encircled and isolated elements with a constant barrage of fire. At daybreak, American and British close air support arrived to help. By the afternoon of August 7, the German attack stalled and the Division quickly counterattacked to relieve its trapped elements, through another five days of fierce fighting. More than 2,000 Old Hickory Soldiers were killed or wounded during the weeklong battle, but their efforts and sacrifice would have a profound impact on the course of history. After the War, eight units within the 30th Infantry Division were recognized with the Presidential Unit Citation. Today, I am proud to direct the Army to honor the remainder of the Division and attached units with the Presidential Unit Citation for their heroic stand at Mortain. This action rightfully recognizes our Veterans who triumphed against incredible odds, as well as those who died during a critical battle that helped ensure the Allied victory in Europe.
254th Infantry Regiment, 63rd Infantry Division	U.S. Army	1945	Colmar, France	
2nd Battalion 254th Infantry Regiment, 63rd Infantry Division	U.S. Army	1945	Jebsheim, France	
1st and 3rd Battalions, 254th Infantry Regiment, 63rd Infantry Division	U.S. Army	1945	Ensheim, Germany (Siegfried Line)	
3d Battalion and Companies A and B, 253d Infantry Regiment, 63rd Infantry Division	U.S. Army	1945	Kleinblittersdorf, Germany	
2nd & 3rd Battalion, 124th Infantry Regiment	U.S. Army	1944	New Guinea	
C Company and 2nd platoon, D Company, 134th Infantry Regiment, 35th Infantry Division	U.S. Army		Rhineland	
1st and 2nd Battalions, 397th Infantry Regiment, 100th Infantry Division	U.S. Army	1946	Central Europe	HEILBRONN inscription
H Company, 397th Infantry Regiment, 100th Infantry Division	U.S. Army	1946	Ardennes-Alsace	RIMLING inscription
3rd Battalion, 397th Infantry Regiment, 100th Infantry Division	U.S. Army	1951	Ardennes-Alsace	RIMLING inscription
3rd Battalion, 398th Infantry Regiment, 100th Infantry Division	U.S. Army	1945	France	BITCHE inscription
3rd Battalion, 398th Infantry Regiment, 100th Infantry Division	U.S. Army	1946	Central Europe	HEILBRONN inscription
1st Battalion, 399th Infantry Regiment, 100th Infantry Division	U.S. Army	1946	France	RAON L'ETAPE inscription
3rd Battalion, 399th Infantry Regiment, 100th Infantry Division	U.S. Army	1952	Central Europe	BEILSTEIN inscription
3rd Battalion, 313th Infantry Regiment, 79th Infantry Division	U.S. Army		France	OBERROEDERN inscription
1st Battalion, 314th Infantry Regiment, 79th Infantry Division	U.S. Army		Northern France	LA HAYE DU PUITS inscription
2nd Battalion, 314th Infantry Regiment, 79th Infantry Division	U.S. Army		Normandy	FORT DU ROULE inscription
A Company, 315th Infantry Regiment, 79th Infantry Division	U.S. Army		Rhineland	EMBERMENIL inscription
2nd Battalion, 315th Infantry Regiment, 79th Infantry Division	U.S. Army		Ardennes-Alsace (Battle of Hatten and Rittershoffen)	HATTEN inscription
F Company, 315th Infantry Regiment, 79th Infantry Division	U.S. Army		Rhineland	EMBERMENIL inscription
3rd Battalion, 315th Infantry Regiment, 79th Infantry Division	U.S. Army		Ardennes-Alsace (Battle of Hatten and Rittershoffen)	RITTERSHOFFEN inscription
310th Field Artillery Battalion, 79th Infantry Division	U.S. Army		Battle of Hatten and Rittershoffen	
B Company, 894th Tank Destroyer Battalion	U.S. Army	1944	Anzio	For distinction during the period from 1 February through 16 February 1944

===== Army Air Forces =====
Unit	Service	Year awarded	Campaign or battle	Notes
99th Bombardment Group	U.S. Army	1944	15th AF – Mediterranean Theater of Operations	23 April 1944 mission to Wiener Neustadt, Romania. Withstanding severe fighter assaults to bomb the vital aircraft factory and facilities
301st Bombardment Group	U.S. Army	1944	15th AF – Mediterranean Theater of Operations	25 February 1944 mission to Regensberg, Romania. In spite of vicious encounters with enemy fighters, the group bombed aircraft production centers.
301st Bombardment Group	U.S. Army	1943	9th AF – Mediterranean Theater of Operations	6 April 1943 mission to Bizerte, Tunisia. The group withstood intense antiaircraft fire from shore defenses and nearby vessels to attack a convoy of merchant ships off Bizerte and thus destroy supplies essential to the Axis defense of Tunisia.
376th Bombardment Group	U.S. Army	1944	15th AF – Mediterranean Theater of Operations	16 June 1944 mission to Bratislava.
376th Bombardment Group	U.S. Army	1943	9th AF – Mediterranean Theater of Operations	1 August 1943 mission to Ploesti, Romania. Realizing that it was off course, the group attempted to reach its assigned objective from another direction; by this time, however, enemy defenses were thoroughly alerted and intense opposition forced the 376th to divert to targets of opportunity in the general target area.
376th Bombardment Group	U.S. Army	1943	9th AF – Mediterranean Theater of Operations	17 August 1943. Actions against the enemy in the Middle East, North Africa and Sicily
449th Bombardment Group	U.S. Army	1944	15th AF – Mediterranean Theater of Operations	4 April 1944 mission to Bucharest, Hungary. Flying without escort, raided marshalling yards in Bucharest; although heavily outnumbered by German fighters, the group succeeded not only in bombing the target but also in destroying many of the enemy interceptors.
449th Bombardment Group	U.S. Army	1944	15th AF – Mediterranean Theater of Operations	9 July 1944 mission to Ploesti, Romania. Flying through heavy smoke and intense enemy fire to attack Concordia oil refinery.
1st Fighter Group	U.S. Army	1944	15th AF – Mediterranean Theater of Operations	22 May 1944 mission to Ploesti, Romania. Exceptional coverage of B-17's after an attack.
82nd Fighter Group	U.S. Army	1944	15th AF – Mediterranean Theater of Operations	10 June 1944 mission to Ploesti, Romania
52nd Fighter Group	U.S. Army	1944	15th AF – Mediterranean Theater of Operations	9 June 1944 mission to Munich, Germany
52nd Fighter Group	U.S. Army	1944	15th AF – Mediterranean Theater of Operations	31 August 1944 mission to Landeplatz Reghin
97th Bombardment Group	U.S. Army	1944	15th AF – Mediterranean Theater of Operations	24 February 1944 mission to Steyr, Austria
97th Bombardment Group	U.S. Army	1944	15th AF – Mediterranean Theater of Operations	18 August 1944 mission to Ploesti, Romania
332nd Fighter Group	U.S. Army	1945	15th AF – Mediterranean Theater of Operations	24 March 1945 mission to Berlin, Germany
14th Fighter Group	U.S. Army	1944	15th AF Mediterranean Theater of Operations	2 April 1944 mission to Steyr, Austria
322nd Bombardment Group	U.S. Army Air Force	1944	European Theater of Operations	HEADQUARTERS        APO 696, U S Army,       NINTH AIR FORCE      28 October 1944 GENERAL ORDERS)  EXTRACT NUMBER...254   BATTLE HONORS 1.  Under the provision of Section IV, Circular Number 333, WD, 1943, the following named units of the Ninth Air Force are cited for outstanding performance of duty in action against the enemy. The citations read as follows:                    ***     "The 322nd Bombardment Group (M). For outstanding performance of duty in action in the European Theater of Operations from 15 May 1943 to 24 July 1944. Throughout this period the members of the 322nd Bombardment Group (M) distinguished themselves by their record of achievement both during the Air Offensive, Europe, and the campaign in Northern Europe, and in the course of operations the group demonstrated unusual ability and versatility in the perfection of new techniques of medium bombardment which were of particular importance in the orientation and training of the 9th Bombardment Division (M) as a whole. After its initial low-level B-26 tactics had proven unsuitable for operations in the type mission upon which the aircraft were dispatched, the 322nd Bombardment Group (M) embarked upon an intensive training program in medium-altitude formation bombing procedure, the success of which was instrumental in the adoption of the B-26 to play a vital role in aerial operations in the European Theater of Operations. The precision achieved in the development of blind formation bombing achieved by the group was an important factor in the employment of the B-26 in operations of great success. In addition, the members of the group distinguished themselves by their brilliant adoption of night bombing technique, which represented and important augmentation to the versatility of medium bombardment aircraft. The outstanding record achieved by the 322nd Bombardment Group (M) throughout these operations, together with the extraordinary success which attended the many innovations in operational procedure, have marked the group and its personnel with particular distinction. The perseverance, fortitude and devotion to duty displayed by the members of the organisation despite the difficulties and hazards of untried ways, place the 322nd Bombardment Group (M) among the ranks of those organisations which have contributed in large measure to the blazing of new trails for the Army Air Forces"                    *** By command of Major General VANDENBERG: W.W.Millard Colonel, GSC C of S.
344th Bombardment Group	U.S. Army Air Force	1944	Cherbourg Peninsula, St. Lo area, Normandy, France	The 344th Bombardment Group (M) is cited for extraordinary heroism in armed conflict with the enemy from 24 to 26 July 1944. The 344th Bombardment Group (M) played a vital role in preparing the way for an Allied offensive on the Cherbourg Peninsula by attacking four vital enemy installations. On 24 July the group dispatched 39 aircraft to attack a key bridge over the Loire River near Tours, which was being used to bring hostile reinforcements into the St. Lo sector. Despite an intense barrage of antiaircraft fire which dispersed the lead flight and damaged 31 aircraft, the intrepid airmen dispatched their bombs with telling effect and destroyed the bridge. On the morning of the following day a full-strength attack was launched against enemy troop concentrations in the path of Allied troops advancing in the area of St. Lo. Four hours later the group attacked and severed a railroad viaduct at Maintenon, and, on 26 July, a formation of B-26 type aircraft from the group destroyed a large supply of fuel and ammunition. As a result of the gallant courage of the airmen and the determined efforts of the ground personnel, the Allied ground forces were able to advance over the area with minimum losses. By their bravery and determination, the officers and men of the 344th Bombardment Group (M) reflect great credit on themselves and the Army Air Forces. (General Orders 170, Headquarters Ninth Air Force, 31 August 1945, as approved by the commanding General, European Theater (Main).) By order of the Secretary of War EDWARD F. WITSELL Major General Acting the Adjutant General DWIGHT D. EISENHOWER Acting Chief of Staff
320th Bombardment Group, 12th Army Air Corps	U.S. Army Air Force	1944	APO 650, Fondi, Italy	For outstanding performance of duty in armed conflict with the enemy in the Mediterranean Theater of Operations on 12 May 1944. Participating in the operations which preceded and supported the Allied breakthrough at Cassino, Italy, the 320th Bombardment Group, displaying extraordinary accuracy in effectively bombarding rail and highway bridges, troop concentrations, airfields and shipping, repeatedly dropped all its bombs within 200 yards of pinpoint targets. On 12 May 1944, in direct support of the Fifth Army's advance along the coastal highway toward Rome, the 320th Bombardment Group achieved spectacular results in an attack on heavily defended enemy troop concentrations, including the famed 15th Panzer Grenadier Division, bivouaced near Fondi. At 1330 hours, thirty six B-26 Marauder aircraft of the 320th Bombardment Group took off from their Sardinian base and made landfall southeast of Sperlonga, Italy. Displaying superior flying skills and extraordinary heroism, the group pilots steadfastly held their flights intact through heavy and accurate anti-aircraft fire which tracked them from landfall to the target and back to the coast. So deadly was the hostile fire that, notwithstanding, the most skillful employment of vigorous evasive action, seventeen of their bombers were damaged and several crew members wounded. Resolutely continuing on a long, deliberate bomb run despite the intense barrage, determined pilots, expertly holding their unescorted Marauders in a superbly coordinated formation, enabled the bombers to release 3,978 fragmentation bombs with unerring precision. The concentrated pattern which blanketed the target area inflicted irreplaceable casualties and destruction upon the already hard pressed enemy, smashing this key concentration of reserves and rendering incalculable aid to the Allied ground forces in their drive northward. The outstanding results achieved which set it above and apart from other units participating in the same engagement are typical of the continuously superior precision bombing of the 320th Bombardment Group, and were possibly only through remarkable leadership, unstinted effort and superlative performance of duty by every member of the organization. Through their unsurpassed courage, skill in combat and steadfast devotion of duty, the personnel of the 320th Bombardment Group have reflected great credit upon themselves and the Military Service of the United States. By Command of Major General Cannon: Official: William Dick, Colonel, Adjudant General. Official: John W Monahan Colonel, AC Chief of Staff
320th Bombardment Group, 12th Army Air Corps	U.S. Army Air Force	1945	APO 374, Saar-Palatinate, Germany	The 320th Bombardment Group. For outstanding performance of duty in action against the enemy in the European Theater of Operations on March 15, 1945. In direct coordination with the Allied Offensive against the enemy ground forces in the Saar-Palatinate, the Seventh Army was ordered to attack directly through the strongly fortified Seigfried Line along a front east of Zweibrucken, Germany; the objective of this Marauder Group was to effectively blanket hostile pillboxes, and tank obstructions with heavy demolition bombs to sufficiently weaken that much vaunted line, enabling the ground forces to break through the enemy positions. Despite accurate anti-aircraft fire from the Seigfried defenses, the 320th Bombardment Group released a devastatingly accurate concentration of bombs to create inestimable damage to installations and personnel. The conspicuous part played by this group set it above and apart from other units participating in the same engagement and insured the success of these operations. Beginning at 0630 hours, on March 15, 1945, five waves of nineteen B-26 aircraft of the 320th Bombardment Group took off from this French base. Despite persistent and accurate ground fire, the Marauders resolutely persevered on unwavering axes of attack to execute long deliberate and flawless bomb runs releasing 1340 high explosives in perfect patterns within the assigned coordinates despite heavy ground haze, inflicting irreplaceable casualties upon the enemy personnel. After photographs revealed pillboxes, communication trenches, weapons pits and roads devastated within the target area with such effect that the Seventh Army made its initial breakthrough of the Seigfried Line with virtually no opposition over the areas attacked by the 320th Bombardment Group. This perfectly executed endeavor of air-ground coordination was carried through to its highly successful conclusion by a complete coverage of heavy, visibly limiting, ground haze. This was accomplished by the remarkable leadership of perfectly teamed pilot-bombardier combinations thoroughly trained in the revolutionary technique on non-visual Shoran bombing and the constantly proficient contributions of all personnel in this Marauder Group. This Operation is typical of the superior bombing of the 320th Bombardment Group, has reflected the greatest credit upon the Group and the Armed Service of the United States. By Command of Major General Webster: C. E. Crumrine, Colonel, AC Chief of Staff.
3d Fighter Group, Fourteenth Air Force	U.S. Army	1945	Mission "A", China	Between 1 May 1944 and 30 June 1944, the Chinese-American Composite Wing waged a campaign against a Japanese advance of 75,000 troops and a full mechanized division, across the Honan Plains. Although the Wing was composed of personnel of two nationalities, had arrived in the area only a few weeks previously, had local maps with only major checkpoints translated into English, and had to have all supplies air-lifted in, it caused the Japanese drive to falter. The Wing accounted for [an estimated] 2317 enemy troops killed or wounded, 1321 cavalry and pack animals destroyed, 865 enemy vehicles destroyed and damaged, 48 aircraft and damaged, and 110 river boats (two more 100 feet in length) destroyed. This while the Wing had an average of 799 officers and enlisted personnel (Chinese and American), with 31 fighter aircraft P-40 and 11 medium bombers B-25 For this, the CACW was awarded the Distinguished Unit Citation on 18 Aug 1945.
387th Bombardment Group	U.S. Army Air Force	1945	Mayen, Germany, Railroad Bridge	The 387th Bombardment Group is cited for extraordinary heroism in armed conflict with the enemy on 23 December 1944, when the group was dispatched to attack a vital and strongly defended railway bridge at Mayen, Germany. While en route to the target the second box of B-26 airplanes, which was without fighter escort and was separated by several miles from the first box, was viciously attacked by from 15 to 25 Messerschmitt aircraft. Despite the determined defensive fire which took a large toll of the hostile fighters, the enemy pressed his attacks with such fury that the low flight was overpowered and four B-26 aircraft were forced down in flames. Although in the ensuing encounters every airplane in the remaining two flights sustained damage from the enemy attacks, the gallant airmen succeeded in driving four of the enemy airplanes to certain destruction and forcing four more to break away in flames. Meanwhile, the first box pressed on to the target despite intermittent flank and the imminence of fighter attack. Although a pathfinder failure occurred 1 minute before bomb-release time, the bombardiers synchronized on the target with such accuracy that extensive damage was inflicted on the bridge. Notwithstanding the heavy losses incurred during the enemy attacks the second box returned for an additional run on the target, and as a result of their determined efforts the central portion of the bridge span was completely destroyed. Despite the severe damage inflicted on the group's aircraft during the morning mission, the officers and men of the 387th Bombardment Group displayed great determination in embarking on another mission only 2 hours after the bombers had returned to base. A withering hail of antiaircraft fire was encountered over the target area at Prum, Germany, which damaged 21 of the 26 airplanes dispatched. In the face of this sustained barrage of flak the courageous airmen released their bombs with a high degree of accuracy upon the communications installations. In carrying out this dual blow against the enemy's communication and transportation facilities on this date, the officers and men of the 387th Bombardment Group displayed aerial skill, resolution, and devotion to duty in keeping with the finest traditions of the Army Air Forces. General Orders 140, Headquarters Ninth Air Force, 23 July 1945, as approved by the Commanding General, United States Forces, European Theater (Main). By command of Major General Weyland Awarded on August 14, 1945, at the Eiffel Tower, Paris, France by Major General William E. Kepner, Commander of the Ninth Air Force.
410th Bombardment Wing (Light), 9th Air Force	U.S. Army Air Force	1944		Awarded a Distinguished Unit Citation for the effectiveness of its attacks on German lines of communication during the Battle of the Bulge.
2d Bombardment Group	U.S. Army	1944	15th AF Mediterranean Theater of Operations	24 February 1944 mission to Steyr, Austria
2d Bombardment Group	U.S. Army	1944	15th AF Mediterranean Theater of Operations	25 February 1944 mission to Regensburg, Germany. Marks the only time in U.S. military aviation history that a unit is awarded back to back citations for actions on successive days.
46th Squadron, 21st Fighter group	U.S. Army	1945		Cited 13 November 1945 for outstanding performance of duty on 7 April 1945 armed conflict with the enemy while escorting B-29 Superfortress attack on the heavily defended Nakajima aircraft factory near Tokyo. Launching from Iwo Jima, this was also the first fighter-escort of bombers over Japan.
56th Fighter Group	U.S. Army	1944	Missions against German aircraft plants and assembly centers.	During the period from 20 February to 9 March 1944, the 56th Fighter Group destroyed 98 enemy aircraft, probably destroyed 9 more and damaged 52 aircraft.
56th Fighter Group	U.S. Army	1944	Operation Market Garden	On 18 September 1944, the 56th Fighter Group flew an extremely dangerous mission to suppress enemy flak positions in support of the airborne landings in the Netherlands. The mission was successfully carried out but resulted in the loss of 16 of 39 aircraft with another 15 damaged.
57th Pursuit Group	U.S. Army	1943		The group destroyed more than 70 of the enemy's transport and fighter aircraft in an aerial battle over the Gulf of Tunis on April 18, 1943, and received a Distinguished Unit Citation.
57th Pursuit Group	U.S. Army	1943		For front-line operations in direct support of the Eighth Army from the Second Battle of El Alamein to the capitulation of enemy forces in Sicily, the group received another Distinguished Unit Citation.
99th Pursuit Squadron	U.S. Army	1943		For the reduction to surrender of the island of Pantelleria, Italy, via the sole means of air power, a historical first.
319th Bombardment Group	U.S. Army	1944		In March, it earned two Distinguished Unit Citations for raids on marshalling yards in Rome and Florence that damaged enemy communications without destroying cultural monuments.
330th Bombardment Group	U.S. Army	1945	Mission 27 & 46	The group received a Distinguished Unit Citation for incendiary raids on the industrial sections of Tokushima and Gifu and for a strike against the hydroelectric power center at Kofu, Japan, in July 1945. The group received another DUC for attacking the Nakajima-Musashino aircraft engine plant near Tokyo in August 1945
367th Fighter Group	U.S. Army	1945	Luftwaffe airfields at Clastres, Péronne and Rosières.	For its achievements on August 25, the 367th Fighter Group received the Presidential Unit Citation, the highest possible award for a unit in combat.
367th Fighter Group	U.S. Army	1945	German Army Headquarters for the entire Western Front.	For this successful undertaking the 367th Fighter Group was awarded an Oak Leaf Cluster to the Presidential Unit Citation.
480th Antisubmarine Group	U.S. Army Air Forces	1944	Battle of the Atlantic	As authorized by Executive Order No. 9396 (Sec. I, Bull. 22, WD, 1943) superseding Executive Order No. 9075 (sec. III, Bull. 11, WD, 1942) citations in the name of the President of the United States, as public evidence of deserved honor and distinction, are awarded to the following-named units. The citations read as follows : The 480th Antisubmarine Group, Army Air Forces, is cited for outstanding performance of duty in action with the enemy during the period 10 November 1942 to 28 October 1943 in the European and North African theaters of operation. It was the pioneer organization in the establishment of Army Air Forces offensive antisubmarine operations in the Eastern Hemisphere. From the beginning of the existence of the Army Air Forces Antisubmarine Command (activated 15 October 1942) this Group led Army Air Forces forces in the fight against the U-boat, carrying the offensive to the home waters of the enemy. Thereby it contributed significantly to the success of United Nations operations in North Africa and to the invasion of Europe. The Group participated in all phases of the Battle of the Atlantic and defeated the enemy above, on, and below the surface of the sea. Its activities reached a climax in the second week of July 1943, when the enemy made every effort to thwart the supply and reinforcement of our forces then undertaking the invasion of Sicily. In the 9 days between 6 and 14 July (inclusive) airplanes of this organization made 12 attacks on enemy submarines, 8 of which resulted in the destruction of, or probable damage to, the enemy. The authorized airplane strength of the Group was 24 B-24 type bombers. Over a period of 12 months this small force sent its airplanes out over the convoy and shipping lanes leading to Europe and North Africa on missions extending as far as 1,250 miles from base and lasting as long as 17 hours. Flying alone and often heavily outnumbered, the 480th Antisubmarine Group's airplanes encountered prowling Ju 88's and Fw 200's, and attacked and defeated them in air battles over convoys and when on patrol. Although outnumbered in these battles in the average ratio of 1 to 3 they destroyed 2 enemy airplanes for each 1 of their own aircraft lost. Its killed and missing personnel number 101 officers and men, nearly 50 percent of its authorized strength (240). The 480th Antisubmarine Group has contributed with heroism and superior efficiency to the winning of the Battle of the Atlantic. Its record is inspiring and worthy of emulation. By Order of the Secretary of War: G. C. Marshall, Chief of Staff. Official: J. A. Ulio, Major General, the Adjutant General. AGO 40, War Department, Washington 25, D.C., 4 January 1944.
484th Bombardment Group	U.S. Army Air Force	1944	Innsbruck, Austria	On 13 Jun 1944 a heavy smoke screen prevented the group from bombing marshalling yards at Munich; however, in spite of severe damage from flak and interceptors, and despite heavy gunfire encountered at the alternate target, the group bombed marshalling yards at Innsbruck and received a DUC for its persistent action.
484th Bombardment Group	U.S. Army Air Force	1944	Vienna	Received second DUC for performance on 21 Aug 1944 when, unescorted, the organization fought its way through intense opposition to attack underground oil storage installations in Vienna.
11th Bombardment Group	U.S. Army Air Force	1942	South Pacific	For action against enemy forces in the Solomon Islands (Guadalcanal) in support of the U.S. Navy.
17th Bombardment Group	U.S. Army	1945	Schweinfurt, Germany	First Tactical Air Force (Provisional), APO 374, 19 May 1945, General Orders Number 128, The 17th Bombardment Group For outstanding performance of duty in action against the enemy in the European Theater of Operations on 10 April 1945. Following the Rhine River crossings made on a large scale by allied Armies, the 42nd United States Infantry Divisions arrived at the out skirts of the fortress city of Schweinfurt, Germany, an important communications center. With its advance towards Nuremberg and Munich impeded by numerous strong points in this city, which constituted one of the principle German held defense bastions, it was necessary to neutralize Schweinfurt by air bombardment. The magnificent air cooperation provided the 42nd Division by the 42nd bombardment Wing On this noteworthy occasion is an eloquent tribute to the effectiveness of air ground coordination and teamwork. The preeminent part played by the 17th Bombardment Group set it above and apart from other units participating in the same engagement and insured the effectiveness of these operations as a whole. After taking off from their base at Dijon, France, at 09.15 hours on 10 April 1945, sixty-eight B-26 aircraft from the Group commenced their bombing run near the objective amid a barrage of heavy and accurate anti-aircraft fire which damaged fifteen of the attacking Marauders. The twelve flights of bombers resolutely persevered on their course over the target in perfect formation and accomplished the bombing with incredible precision. Photo reconnaissance revealed that the 133 tons of bombs released on the objective by the 17th Bombardment Group achieved unparalleled destruction. Such extensive damage was inflicted upon the city by blast and fire that the military effectiveness of the enemy troops defending the city was paralyzed. The success of the mission, so typical of the superior bombing of the 17th Bombardment Group, was so catastrophic for the enemy that the 42nd Division was able to seize Schweinfurt with virtually no opposition, thereby accelerating the advance of the Seventh Army towards Nuremberg and Munich, thus bringing to a more rapid conclusion the ultimate victory of the Allies. The thoroughness of the mission planning and the precision of the execution attests to the efficiency, élan, and determination of the combat crews. The superior results achieved are attributable to the extensive cooperation and devotion to duty displayed by the ground crews and the administration staffs who made possible such an exceptional achievement. The enormous damage inflicted upon the enemy installations by the 17th Bombardment Group in the Mediterranean and European Theater of Operations, during a period of twenty-nine consecutive months of air warfare was accomplished by a consistently high bombing accuracy which is believed to be without precedent. Through its unique and highly successful performance against the enemy in six hundred and six bombing missions, the 17th Bombardment Group has won for itself an enviable position in the Army Air Forces which reflected the greatest credit upon the Group conforming to the most illustrious traditions of the United States military service.
92nd Bombardment Group	U.S. Army Air Force	1944	Oschersleben, Germany	Field Order _; Tuesday, 11 JAN 1944; Primary Target: Oschersleben, Secondary Target: Halberstadt, Formation: The 92nd Bomb Group (325th, 326th, 327th, 407th Squadrons) 40th Combat Wing, the 325th flew High Squadron-High Group, 407th Low Squadron.
389th Bomb Group	U.S. Army Air Corps	August 1, 1943	Câmpina, Ploiești, Romania	
450th Bombardment Group	U.S. Army Air Corps	1944	Regensburg, Germany	The 450th Bombardment Group (H) is cited for outstanding performance of duty in armed conflict with the enemy. On 24 February 1944, the 450th Bombardment Group (H) was notified to prepare a maximum number of aircraft for a mission against the Prufening Aircraft Factory in Regensburg, Germany. The initial purpose of this attack was to destroy the important plant, capable of producing two hundred and fifty Messerschmitt Bf 109's monthly. A successful completion of the mission would cost the enemy 8 to 9 months of production and would materially diminish Nazi interception of allied strategic bombing on the continent. Throughout the evening prior to the attack the ground crews worked untiringly in a muddy field, determined to have their aircraft in perfect mechanical condition for this vital operation. On 25 February 1944, twenty nine B-24 type aircraft heavily loaded with maximum tonnage took off for their important destination in the lead of an entire wing formation. Hazardous weather was encountered shortly after the take off, and over 15 enemy fighters intercepted them while they were still 300 miles from the target. The gallant crews fought off the enemy onslaught, overcame the hazards of weather, and unwaveringly held to their course as a second wave of twenty Messerschmitt Bf 109's attacked them. The approach to the target and the target proper were heavily defended by flak batteries that threw up an intense barrage through which the formation flew undaunted to a precise bombing run, delivering a telling blow to the important factory and surrounding installations. This outstanding contributed immeasurably to the effective crippling of enemy production at a significant time. The palls of smoke issuing from the debris left in the wake of the bombers obscured observation, but subsequent reconnaissance revealed a complete destruction of the target. Throughout the serial battle the courageous crews fought two more enemy onslaughts en route and accounted for one enemy aircraft destroyed. Our own losses were held down to 4 lost, in a mission wrought with hazardous weather, intense ground defenses, and a total of over 60 enemy fighters. By the determination, outstanding professional skill, and heroic courage of the combat crews, together with the devotion to duty of the ground personnel, the 450th Bombardment Group (H) has rendered an invaluable contribution to the allied war effort, thereby reflecting great credit on themselves and the armed forces of the United States.
450th Bombardment Group	U.S. Army Air Corps	1944	Ploesti, Romania	For outstanding performance of duty in armed conflict with the enemy. On 4 April 1944, the 450th Bombardment Group was notified to prepare a maximum number of aircraft for a mission against the Ploesti Marshalling Yards in Rumania. The initial purpose of this mission was disrupt the enemy's oil supply so vital to their operations on the Eastern front and to their interception of Allied strategic bombing. Prior to this operation, the ground crews worked zealously with grim determination to have their aircraft at the peak of mechanical performance to insure the success of the mission. On 5 April 1944, forty (40) B-24 type aircraft, heavily loaded with maximum tonnage, were airborne, and, after assuming the lead of the wing formation, set course for their destination. Nearin the target the formation was aggressively attacked by approximately fifty (50) enemy aircraft, firing rockets, cannon and heavy machine guns, in a desperate effort to break up and destroy the bomber formation before the objective was reached. Displaying outstanding courage and determination, realizing the strategic importance of their task, the gallant crew battled their way through to the target. Despite the persistence of the fighter attacks, the intense barrage of enemy flak and partial concealment of the target by a smoke screen, the group continued for a highly successful bombing run, inflicting grave damage to vital enemy installations, supplies and equipment. Throughout the aerial battle, these gallant crews, in the heroic defense of their aircraft, destroyed a total of twenty-seven (27) enemy fighters and probably destroyed or damaged many more, thus holding our losses to a minimum for such a long and extremely hazardous mission. By the conspicuous gallantry, professional skill and determination of the combat crews, together with the superior technical skill and devotion to duty of the ground personnel, the 450th Bombardment Group has reflected great credit upon itself and the Armed forces of the United States of America.
463rd Bombardment Group	U.S. Army Air Force	1944	Ploesti, Romania	The 463d Bombardment Group is cited for outstanding performance of duty in armed conflict with the enemy. Assigned the mission to attack and destroy the Romano Americano Oil Refinery, Ploesti, Romania, in an effort to reduce the total Axis oil production to a critical point in her military requirements. The ground crews worked enthusiastically and with grim determination to have their aircraft at the peak of mechanical perfection to insure the success of this mission despite the damages and losses suffered by their group through a sustained period of operations. On 18 May 1944, thirty-five B-17 type aircraft, heavily loaded with maximum tonnage, were airborne, and despite adverse weather conditions rallied with the wing formation and set course for their destination. Under continued adverse weather conditions encountered en route, the visibility became so limited, with dense cloud layers reaching to 30,000-foot elevation, that all other units returned to base. Undaunted by the seemingly overwhelming odds, the 463d Bombardment Group continued on alone through the dense cloud coverage, which rendered compact formation flying extremely hazardous. Despite intense, heavy, and accurate enemy anti-aircraft fire encountered over the target, the gallant crews, displaying outstanding courage, professional skill, and determination, though many of their airplanes were damaged severely, maintained their tight formation and brought their ships through the enemy defenses for a highly successful bombing run, inflicting grave damage to vital enemy installations and supplies. Rallying off the target after the bombing run and while unprotected by friendly fighters, the group was savagely attacked by approximately 100 highly aggressive enemy fighters. In the ensuing fierce engagement, while battling their way through the heavy enemy opposition, the group lost 7 bombers; however, in the gallant defense of the formation, the gunners accounted for 28 enemy aircraft destroyed, 30 probably destroyed, and 2 damaged. With the arrival of friendly fighters, the remaining bombers proceeded for a safe landing without further damage. By the extraordinary heroism, airmanship, and grim determination of the combat crews, together with the highly technical skill and intense devotion to duty of the ground personnel, the 463d Bombardment Group has upheld the highest traditions of the military service, thereby reflecting great credit on themselves and the armed forces of the United States.
463rd Bombardment Group	U.S. Army Air Force	1945	Berlin, Germany	The 463d Bombardment Group is cited for outstanding performance of duty in armed conflict with the enemy. On 24 March 1945, this group was notified to prepare maximum aircraft to lead a wing formation on a mission to attack and destroy the Daimler-Benz Tank Works in Berlin, Germany. A successful completion of this mission would materially reduce the enemy hopes of a prolonged defensive against the Red Army then deployed on the eastern banks of the Oder River. Realizing the strategic importance of this undertaking, the deepest escorted penetration ever attempted in the European Theatre of Operations, and one hitherto deemed all but impossible from bases in Southern Italy, the ground crews enthusiastically and sedulously labored day and night to bring all available aircraft to the peak of mechanical efficiency despite the extensive battle damages incurred in the almost daily operations of the preceding month. Operations and Intelligence personnel indefatigably applied their greatest efforts to supply the carefully selected crews with vital bomb and target data. On 24 March 1945, thirty-one B-17 type aircraft loaded with maximum bomb tonnage took off, made rendezvous with other groups of the Wing, and after assuming the lead, set course for the objective. The Alps crossed, and having bypassed all known flak areas in Austria and Czechoslovakia, the group had almost entered Germany proper when suddenly and without warning it was savagely opposed by a concentrated and sustained anti-aircraft barrage which inflicted heavy damage to nearly the entire formation and destroyed four heavy bombers. Despite the intensity and accuracy of the heavy guns, the gallant crews battled their way through the many defenses, reformed the temporarily demoralized and scattered aircraft of the wing, and were successful at holding the entire formation intact at this critical stage of the flight. Passing out of the effective range of the gun emplacements, the battered group was immediately attacked by 15 jet propelled enemy fighters firing cannon and rockets which were only dispersed by the belated but aggressive appearance of friendly fighters after another bomber was destroyed in the running battle. As the fight continued, the crippled airplanes were realigned into three squadrons for the dual purposes of protective cover and bombing accuracy. Nearing the specific target, the flak-riddled formation was for the third time subjected to a stiffened enemy resistance and a sixth ship was shot down, but not withstanding the severe damage sustained by the aircraft, the unnerving experiences just passed, the improvised character of the formation, the last minute change of bombing calculations, and the weariness induced by many hours spent at high altitude, the 463rd Bombardment Group relentlessly and unswervingly led the entire wing formation through for an exceptionally successful bombing run, with the complete bomb tonnage of its formation concentrated in the target area thus inflicting extensive damage to vital enemy installations and supplies so greatly needed by the enemy in its defense of the capital city. Turning off the target, the formation rallied and turned for home. The long and still hazardous trip through heavily defended enemy terrain over mountainous regions and finally over water was too great a strain for 6 of the 20 airplanes which had reached the heart of the enemy's productive system and these were forced down at friendly fields in northern Italy and Yugoslavia for medical treatment to the many wounded men as well as mechanical repairs to the crippled aircraft. Only 14 of the original attacking force were successful in reaching their home base, but in no instance was there a reported case of insufficient fuel, so brilliantly had this mission been planned and so skillfully flown. By the conspicuous courage, airmanship, and determination of the combat crews, together with the outstanding professional skill and devotion to duty of the maintenance crews, the 463rd Bombardment Group upheld the highest traditions of the armed forces of the United States.
483rd Bombardment Group	U.S. Army Air Force	1944	Germany	For outstanding performance of duty in action against the enemy on 18 July 1944. In connection with the counter air offensive against vitally import and high priority targets in Germany, the 483rd Bombardment Group (H) was ordered to attack and destroy the enemy airdrome and installations at Memmingen. En route to the target, the Group became separated from the other Groups in the formation and from the fighter escort by extremely severe and adverse weather conditions. Alone, the Group proceeded to the target area where it was aggressively attacked by approximately two hundred (200) enemy fighters. In the air battle which ensued, gunners of the Group shot down or damaged sixty-six (66) enemy aircraft at the same time losing fourteen (14) airplanes with their entire crews. Undismayed by the ferocity and viciousness of the attack and in spite of the severe losses suffered, the remainder of the Group proceeded, and with great heroism, gallantry and determination, carried out the bombing attack as ordered, though under the concentrated gunfire of the entire enemy fighter force. The bombs were dropped on the target with devastating effect, destroying all major installations and destroying or damaging an additional thirty-five (35) grounded enemy aircraft. Throughout the entire action which was carried out with exceptional gallantry and determination, and in spite of overwhelming opposition, crew esprit and individual heroism could not be excelled. By their professional skill and devotion to duty, their extraordinary display of heroism in the face of unparalleled odds and the exceptionally gallant manner in which this attack was carried out, combat and ground personnel, 483rd Bombardment Group (H), have reflected great credit upon themselves and the Armed Forces of the United States of America.
317th Troop Carrier Group	U.S. Army Air Force	1945	Battle of Corregidor, Philippines	For outstanding performance of duty in action in the Philippine Islands on 16 and 17 February 1945. As part of the campaign to liberate Luzon it was necessary that American forces retake from the Japanese the historic island fortress of Corregidor at the mouth of Manila Bay so as to open the port of Manila to Allied shipping. The 317th Troop Carrier Group was assigned the mission of transporting and dropping the parachute troops who were to land on the plateau at the western end of the rocky island. Successful accomplishment of the operation demanded thorough preparation, sound judgment, and exceptional flying skill on the part of the crews of the C-47's. The 2 zones into which the paratroopers and their supplies were to be placed were of such small size that each plane had to come over the target individually and drop not more than 8 men on each pass. Corregidor, with its multitude of caves, tunnels, and dug-in positions, afforded ideal concealment for anti-aircraft gunners and was a hazardous target over which to fly unarmed, unarmored C-47's at a height of only 400 to 600 feet above the dropping zones. On the morning of 16 February, 51 of the group's C-47's dropped a total of 1,021 paratroopers and 151 bundles of supplies in a period of one hour, more than 92 percent of the troops and supplies landing in the designated areas. In a period of nearly 1½ hours on the afternoon of the same day 50 C-47's dropped 978 paratroopers and 159 bundles, 94 percent of the men and supplies landing in the target zones. On the morning of 17 February, 43 C-47s dropped 197 bundles of supplies in less than an hour; 95 percent to 98 percent hit the target. On the afternoon of 17 February, during a period of nearly 2½ hours, 785 bundles of supplies were dropped by 33 C-47s, 98 percent landing in the target zones. In all, approximately 563 separate passes had to be made to put the 1,999 paratroopers and 1,292 bundles on Corregidor. Anti-aircraft and small arms fire from the desperate and fanatical Japanese defenders of the island damaged 25 of the transports. The outstanding courage and superb flying skill of its air crews and the tireless determination and exemplary technical proficiency of its ground echelon enabled the 317th Troop Carrier Group to play a significant role in the liberation of Luzon. Its achievements have brought great honor to the armed forces of the United States. By direction of the President, under the provisions of Executive Order No. 9396 (Section I, Bulletin 22, WD, 1943), superseding Executive Order No. 9075 (Section III, Bulletin 2, WD, 1942), and of Section IV, Circular No. 333, WD, 1943, the following units are cited by the Commanding General, Far East Air Forces:
442nd Troop Carrier Group	U.S. Army Air Force	1944	D Day: Operation_Overlord, France	For outstanding performance of duty in action against the enemy on 5, 6, and 7 June 1944. On these dates, members of Group Headquarters and of the 303d, 304th, 305th, and 306th Troop Carrier Squadrons of the 442nd Troop Carrier Group accomplished 108 sorties in unarmed and unarmored aircraft, in unfavorable weather, at minimum altitudes and airspeeds, over water, in troop carrier's bold leadership of the invasion of the European Continent. The magnificent teamwork of the personnel of this unit, the expert performance of their duties with coolness and precision, despite formidable opposing ground fire, and the courage displayed in their dispatch of their loads of paratroops with extreme accuracy over vital zones are in keeping with the highest traditions of the service. General Orders No 85, War Department, Washington 25, D.C., 3 November 1944

==== Navy ====
Unit	Service	Year awarded	Campaign or battle	Notes
USS Redfish (SS-395)	U.S. Navy	1945	Midway / Pacific Campaign	USS REDFISH 395 received a PRESIDENTIAL UNIT CITATION which read "For extraordinary heroism in action during the First and Second War Patrols against enemy Japanese surface units in the restricted waters of the Pacific. Operating In bold defiance of foul weather and persistent hostile depth charging, gunfire and bombing by outnumbering forces of radar-equipped ships, air escorts and patrol craft, the U.S.S. REDFISH launched her accurate and intensive gun and torpedo fire during brief periods of concentrated attack to sink a new Japanese aircraft carrier with her entire complement of embarked planes and equipment destined to be used against our forces, to damage severely another vital carrier and to destroy or cripple much additional shipping necessary to the enemy's continued prosecution of the war. Although forced to the bottom In 230 feet of water by vicious countermeasures, with her pressure hull cracked and numerous leaks throughout, the REDFISH responded gallantly to the superb handling of her skilled and aggressive ship's company and succeeded in evading further damage and returning to port. Her brilliant record of success in combat and her indomitable fighting spirit in the face of the most determined and fierce counterattacks by an alert and relentless enemy reflect the highest credit upon the REDFISH, her valiant officers and men and the United States Naval Service."
USS Pigeon (ASR-6)	U.S. Navy	1941	Cavite Navy Yard / Philippine Islands	USS PIGEON ASR-6 received two PRESIDENTIAL UNIT CITATION awards retroactively, after President Roosevelt created the award in 1942. The first was for her specific action at the start of the Japanese invasion of The Philippines at Cavite Naval Yard on 10 December 1941. The second was for her ongoing service during the invasion through the month of December, 1941. "Pigeon was moored in a five-ship nest at the Cavite Navy Yard 10 December 1941 when Japanese bombers launched massive raids. But Commander Hawes had relieving tackles rigged, steam at throttle, and men ready for action. His foresight saved Pigeon and submarine Seadragon, soon to become a tonnage champion of World War II." Pigeon was the first US Navy ship to receive the PRESIDENTIAL UNIT CITATION and the only Navy ship to receive two of them during World War II.
USS O'Bannon (DD-450)	U.S. Navy	1943	Solomon Islands Campaign	The President of the United States takes pleasure in presenting the PRESIDENTIAL UNIT CITATION to the UNITED STATES SHIP USS O'BANNON (DD-450) for service as set forth in the following CITATION: "For outstanding performance in combat against enemy Japanese forces in the South Pacific from October 7, 1942, to October 7, 1943. An aggressive veteran after a year of continuous and intensive operations in this area, the U.S.S. O'BANNON has taken a tremendous toll of vital Japanese warships, surface vessels, and aircraft. Launching a close-range attack on hostile combatant ships off Guadalcanal on the night of November 13, 1942, the O'BANNON scored three torpedo hits on a Japanese battleship, boldly engaged two other men o' war with gunfire and retired safely in spite of damage sustained. During three days of incessant hostilities in July 1943, she gallantly stood down Kula Gulf to bombard enemy shore positions in coverage of our assault groups, later taking a valiant part in the rescue of survivors from the torpedoed U.S.S. STRONG while under fierce coastal battery fire and aerial bombing attack and adding her firepower toward the destruction of a large Japanese naval force. In company with two destroyers, the O'BANNON boldly intercepted and repulsed nine hostile warships off Vella Lavella on October 7, 1943, destroying two enemy ships and damaging others. Although severely damaged, she stood by to take aboard and care for survivors of a friendly torpedoed destroyer and retired to base under her own power. The O'BANNON's splendid achievements and the gallant fighting spirit of her officers and men reflect great credit upon the United States Naval Service." For the President, /s/ Frank Knox, Secretary of the Navy
USS Alchiba (AKA-6)	U.S. Navy	1943	Guadalcanal Campaign	Navy Citation, for service at Guadalcanal from August through December 1942: "The vessel arrived off Guadalcanal on 7 August, disembarked her troops, unloaded her cargo, and left the Solomons two days later, bound for New Caledonia. Alchiba returned to Guadalcanal on 18 September. After unloading cargo to support marines struggling for that island, she sailed back to New Caledonia for more supplies and returned to Guadalcanal on 1 November. She was anchored off Lunga Point at 0616 on 28 November, when two torpedoes from the Japanese submarine 1–16 exploded on the vessel's port side. At that time, her hold was loaded with drums of gasoline and ammunition, and the resulting explosion shot flames 150 feet (46 m) in the air. The commanding officer ordered the ship to get underway to run her up on the beach. This action undoubtedly saved the ship. Hungry flames raged in the ship for over five days before weary fire fighting parties finally brought them under control. Salvage operations began soon thereafter. Most of her cargo was saved, and temporary repairs were in progress when Alchiba was torpedoed again on 7 December. An enemy submarine's conning tower had been spotted shortly before two torpedoes were fired. One passed close under the cargo ship's stern, but the other struck her port side near the engine room. The blast killed three men, wounded six others, and caused considerable structural damage. Once the fires and flooding were controlled, salvage operations resumed and enabled the ship to get underway for Tulagi on 27 December 1942."
USS Archerfish (SS-311)	U.S. Navy	1944	For sinking the Japanese aircraft carrier Shinano in November 1944 – the largest warship ever sunk by a submarine	The President of the United States takes pleasure in presenting the PRESIDENTIAL UNIT CITATION to the UNITED STATES SHIP ARCHERFISH for service as set forth in the following CITATION: "For extraordinary heroism in action during the Fifth War Patrol against enemy Japanese combatant units in restricted waters of the Pacific. Relentless in tracking an alert and powerful hostile force which constituted a potential threat to our vital operations in the Philippine area, the U.S.S. ARCHERFISH culminated a dogged six and one-half-hour pursuit by closing her high speed target, daringly penetrated the strong destroyer escort screen, and struck fiercely at a large Japanese aircraft carrier (SHINANO) with all six of her torpedoes finding their mark to sink this extremely vital enemy ship. Subjected to devastating air and surface anti-submarine measures, the ARCHERFISH skillfully evaded her attackers by deep submergence and returned to port in safety. Handled with superb seamanship, she responded gallantly to the fighting determination of the officers and men and dealt a fatal blow to one of the enemy's major Fleet units despite the most merciless Japanese opposition and rendered valiant service toward the ultimate destruction of a crafty and fanatic enemy." For the President, /s/ James Forrestal Secretary of the Navy
USS Barb (SS-220)	U.S. Navy	1945	U.S. submarine campaign against the Japanese Empire	The President of the United States takes pleasure in presenting the PRESIDENTIAL UNIT CITATION to the UNITED STATES SHIP BARB for service as set forth in the following CITATION: "For extraordinary heroism in action during the Eighth, Ninth, Tenth, and Eleventh War Patrols against enemy Japanese surface forces in restricted waters of the Pacific. Persistent in her search for vital targets, the USS BARB relentlessly tracked down the enemy and struck with indomitable fury despite unfavorable attack opportunity and severe countermeasures. Handled superbly, she held undeviatingly to her aggressive course and, on contacting a concentration of hostile ships in the lower reaches of a harbor, boldly penetrated the formidable screen. Riding dangerously, surfaced, in shallow water, the BARB launched her torpedoes into the enemy group to score devastating hits on the major targets, thereafter retiring at high speed on the surface in a full hour's run through uncharted, heavily mined and rock obstructed waters. Inexorable in combat, the BARB also braved the perils of a tropical typhoon to rescue fourteen British and Australian prisoners of war who had survived the torpedoing and sinking of a hostile transport ship en route from Singapore to the Japanese Empire. Determined in carrying the fight to the enemy, the BARB has achieved an illustrious record of gallantry in action, reflecting the highest credit upon her valiant officers and men and upon the United States Naval Service."
USS Bogue (CVE-9) Hunter-killer Groups	U.S. Navy	1944	Battle of the Atlantic	The President of United States takes pleasure in presenting the PRESIDENTIAL UNIT CITATION to the following six Anti-Submarine Task Groups which operated with the U.S.S. BOGUE as Flagship: TG 21.11 – United States Ships Bogue, Haverfield, Swenning, Willis, Hobson (until March 25), Janssen (until April 7), and VC-96, from February 26 to April 19, 1944. TG 22.2 – United States Ships Bogue, Haverfield, Swenning, Willis, Janssen, F.M. Robinson, and VC-69, from May 4 to July 3, 1944. TG 22.3 – United States Ships Bogue, Haverfield, Swenning, Willis, Janssen, Wilhoite and VC-42, from August 1–24, 1944. For service as set forth in the following CITATION: "For extraordinary heroism in action against enemy submarines in the Atlantic Area from April 20, 1943, to August 24, 1944. Carrying out powerful and sustained offensive action during a period of heavy German undersea concentrations threatening our uninterrupted flow of supplies to the European theater of operations, these Six Anti-Submarine Task Groups tracked the enemy packs relentlessly, and by the unwavering vigilance and persistent aggressiveness of all units involved, sank a notable number of hostile U-boats. The gallantry and superb teamwork of the officers and men who fought the embarked planes and manned the BOGUE and her escort vessels were largely instrumental in forcing the complete withdrawal of enemy submarines from supply routes essential to the maintenance of our established military supremacy." For the President, James Forrestal Secretary of the Navy (Note 1: This text was taken from a citation to USS Haverfield, which does not list three cited periods that the Bogue operated without Haverfield: 20-APR-1943 to 20-JUN-1943, 12-JUL-1943 to 23-AUG-1943, 14-NOV-1943 to 29-DEC-1943, per http://www.usshorne.net/horne/images/ribbons/opnavnote1650.pdf) (Note 2: The Navy considers this as one award, covering multiple dates, per http://www.usshorne.net/horne/images/ribbons/opnavnote1650.pdf)
USS Enterprise (CV-6)	U.S. Navy	1943	Air raids on the Marshall Islands (1942), Doolittle Raid, Battle of Midway, Battle of the Eastern Solomons, Battle of the Santa Cruz Islands, Naval Battle of Guadalcanal, Guadalcanal Campaign	Navy Citation, for 7 December 1941 to 15 November 1942. First aircraft carrier to receive the PUC. Most decorated U.S. Navy ship from World War II. "For consistently outstanding performance and distinguished achievement during repeated action against enemy Japanese forces in the Pacific war area, December 7, 1941, to November 15, 1942. Participating in nearly every major carrier engagement in the first year of the war, the Enterprise and her air group, exclusive of far-flung destruction of hostile shore installations throughout the battle area, did sink or damage on her own a total of 35 Japanese vessels and shoot down a total of 185 Japanese aircraft. Her aggressive spirit and superb combat efficiency are fitting tribute to the officers and men who so gallantly established her as an ahead bulwark in the defense of the American nation."
USS Cabot (CVL-28)	U.S. Navy	1945	Airgroup 31. Marshall Islands, Truk, Palau, Hollandia, Marianas, Bonins, Yap, Philippines. Airgroup 29. Ryukyus, Formosa, Philippines, Luzon, China Sea, Japan, Bonins.	One of 3 light aircraft carriers to be awarded the Presidential Unit Citation in WW II. The President of the United States takes pleasure in presenting the PRESIDENTIAL UNIT CITATION to the U.S.S. CABOT and her attached Air Groups participating in the following operations: January 29 to February 16, 1944, Marshalls, Truk; March 29 to April 30, 1944, Palau, Hollandia, Truk; June 11 to August 5, 1944, Marianas, Bonins, Yap; September 6 to 24, 1944, Philippines, Palau, Yap: AG-31 (VF-31, VT-31). October 10 to November 25, 1944, Ryukyus, Formosa, Philippines, Luzon; December 14 to 16, 1944, Luzon; January 3 to 22, 1945, Philippines, Formosa, China Sea, Ryukyus; February 16 to 25, 1945, Japan, Bonins; March 18 to April 8, 1945, Ryukyus, Japan: AG-29 (VF-29, VT-29). for service as set forth in the following CITATION: "For extraordinary heroism in action against enemy Japanese forces in the air, ashore and afloat in the Pacific War Area from January 29, 1944, to April 8, 1945. Operating continuously in the most forward areas, the U.S.S. CABOT and her air groups struck crushing blows toward annihilating Japanese fighting power; they provided air cover for our amphibious forces; they fiercely countered the enemy's aerial attacks and destroyed his planes; and they inflicted terrific losses on the Japanese in Fleet and merchant marine units sunk or damaged. Daring and dependable in combat, the CABOT with her gallant officers and men rendered loyal service in achieving the ultimate defeat of the Japanese Empire."
USS Houston (CA-30)	U.S. Navy	1942, 1944	Java Campaign, ending with Second Battle of the Java Sea	Navy Citation... "(f)or action in the Battle of Sunda Strait." Sunk in action with HMAS Perth against incredible odds. The two ships steamed into a Japanese invasion force and were sunk in the ensuing battle.
USS Hugh W. Hadley (DD-774)	U.S. Navy	1945	Battle of Okinawa	USS Hugh W. Hadley (DD-774) "For extraordinary heroism in action as Fighter Direction Ship on Radar Picket Station Number 15 during an attack by approximately 100 enemy Japanese planes, forty miles northwest of the Okinawa Transport Area, May 11, 1945. Fighting valiantly against waves of hostile suicide and dive-bombing planes plunging toward her from all directions, the U.S.S. HUGH HADLEY sent up relentless barrages of antiaircraft fire during one of the most furious air-sea battles of the war. Repeatedly finding her targets, she destroyed twenty enemy planes, skillfully directed her Combat Air Patrol in shooting down at least forty others and, by her vigilance and superb battle readiness, avoided damage to herself until subjected to a coordinated attack by ten Japanese planes. Assisting in the destruction of all ten of these, she was crushed by one bomb and three suicide planes with devastating effect. With all engineering spaces flooded and with a fire raging amidships, the gallant officers and men of the HUGH W. HADLEY fought desperately against almost insurmountable odds and, by their indomitable determination, fortitude and skill, brought the damage under control, enabling their ship to be towed to port and saved. Her brilliant performance in this action reflects the highest credit upon the HUGH W. HADLEY and the United States Naval Service."
USS Pope (DD-225)	U.S. Navy	1942, 1944	Java Campaign, ending with Second Battle of the Java Sea	Navy Citation... "(f)or extraordinary heroism in action against enemy Japanese forces in the Java Campaign in the Southwest Pacific War Area, from January 23 to March 1, 1942...".
USS Santee (CVE-29)	U.S. Navy	1942 to 1945	CAG-29 (VGS-29, VGF-29), North Africa, November 8 to 11, 1942; CAG-29, Task Group 21.11, June 13 to August 6, 1943; CVEG-26, Palau, Yap, Ulithi, Woleai Raid, March 30 to April 1, 1944; CVEG-26, Western New Guinea Operation, April 22 to May 5, 1944; CVEG-26, Western New Guinea Operation, September 15 to 27, 1944; CVEG-26, Leyte Operation, October 12 to 27, 1944; CVEG-24, Okinawa Gunto Operation, March 25 to June 16, 1945; CVEG-24, Third Fleet Operations against Japan, July 10 to 15, 1945	USS Santee (CVE-29) "For extraordinary heroism in action against enemy forces in the air, ashore and afloat. Operating in the most advanced areas, the U.S.S. SANTEE and her attached air squadrons struck with sustained fury at hostile warships, aircraft, merchant shipping and shore installations in the face of frequent and prolonged enemy air attacks. During the historic Battle for Leyte Gulf, the valiant SANTEE withstood successively the shattering explosion of a suicide plane in her flight deck and a torpedo hit in her side, stoutly conducting flight operations and fighting her antiaircraft guns throughout the period of emergency repairs. Despite the strain of constant alerts and long periods of unrelieved action, she sent out her planes to cover our landing operations and land offensives and to destroy the enemy's vital airfields and his camouflaged dispersal areas. The SANTEE's illustrious record of combat achievement reflects the highest credit upon her gallant officers and men and upon the United States Naval Service."
USS Sealion (SS-315)	U.S. Navy	1945	U.S. submarine campaign against the Japanese Empire	Navy Citation, for first through sixth war patrols – 8 June 1943 to 30 June 1945 "For extraordinary heroism in action during the Second and Third War Patrols against enemy Japanese surface forces in restricted waters of the Pacific. Operating dangerously in defiance of extremely strong air and surface opposition, the U.S.S. SEALION penetrated deep into hostile waters to maintain a steady offensive against ships vital to Japan's prosecution of the war. Consistently outnumbered and outgunned, she pursued her aggressive course in spite of formidable screens and severe anti-submarine measures to strike at every opportunity and, by her concentrated torpedo fire, delivered against convoys and combatant ships, sank thousands of tons of enemy shipping including one large battleship and a destroyer of a major hostile task force, and seriously damaged another battleship. Daring and skilled in carrying the fight to the enemy, the SEALION also braved the perils of a tropical typhoon to rescue fifty-four British and Australian prisoners of war, survivors of a hostile transport ship torpedoed and sunk while en route from Singapore to the Japanese Empire. Her meritorious record of achievement is evidence of her own readiness for combat and the gallantry and superb seamanship of the officers and men who brought her through unscathed." For the President, /signed/ JAMES FORRESTAL Secretary of the Navy
USS Trigger (SS-237)	U.S. Navy	1943	U.S. submarine campaign against the Japanese Empire	Navy Citation, for fifth, sixth, and seventh war patrols – 30 April to 8 December 1943
USS Tirante (SS-420)	U.S. Navy	1945	U.S. submarine campaign against the Japanese Empire	Navy Citation for first war patrol – March 1945. Commanding Officer George L. Street III awarded Medal of Honor
Torpedo Squadron 8 (VT-8) (2 citations)	U.S. Navy	1943	Battle of Midway	For first combat mission, 4 June 1942. Second citation for Battle of Guadalcanal
Mine Division 34 (Pacific Fleet)	U.S. Navy	1945	Borneo	USS Sentry (Flagship)—Borneo Liberation Support
Task Unit 77.4.3 (a.k.a. "Taffy 3")	U.S. Navy	1944	Battle off Samar	Taffy 3 was made up of six escort carriers, three destroyers and four destroyer escorts: USS St Lo (CVE-63) and VC-65, USS White Plains (CVE-66) and VC-4, USS Kalinin Bay (CVE-68) and VC-3, USS Fanshaw Bay (CVE-70) and VC-68, USS Kitkun Bay (CVE-71) and VC-5, USS Gambier Bay (CVE-73) and VC-10, USS Heermann (DD-532), USS Hoel (DD-533), USS Johnston (DD-557), USS John C. Butler (DE-339), USS Raymond (DE-341), USS Dennis (DE-405), USS Samuel B. Roberts (DE-413). In the Battle off Samar, these 13 ships repelled the 23 battleships, heavy cruisers, light cruisers and destroyers of the Japanese Center Force engaged in the collection of naval battles associated with the landings at Leyte Gulf. "For extraordinary heroism in action against powerful units of the Japanese Fleet during the Battle off Samar, Philippines, October 25, 1944. Silhouetted against the dawn as the Central Japanese Force steamed through San Bernardino Strait towards Leyte Gulf, Task Unit 77.4.3 was suddenly taken under attack by hostile cruisers on its port hand, destroyers on the starboard and battleships from the rear. Quickly laying down a heavy smoke screen, the gallant ships of the Task Unit waged battle fiercely against the superior speed and fire power of the advancing enemy, swiftly launching and rearming aircraft and violently zigzagging in protection of vessels stricken by hostile armor-piercing shells, anti-personnel projectiles and suicide bombers. With one carrier of the group sunk, others badly damaged and squadron aircraft courageously coordinating in the attacks by making dry runs over the enemy Fleet as the Japanese relentlessly closed in for the kill, two of the Unit's valiant destroyers and one destroyer escort charged the battleships point-blank and, expending their last torpedoes in desperate defense of the entire group, went down under the enemy's heavy shells as a climax to two and one half hours of sustained and furious combat. The courageous determination and the superb teamwork of the officers and men who fought the embarked planes and who manned the ships of Task Unit 77.4.3 were instrumental in effecting the retirement of a hostile force threatening our Leyte invasion operations and were in keeping with the highest traditions of the United States Naval Service." For the President, /signed/ JAMES FORRESTAL Secretary of the Navy This unit also awarded the Philippine Presidential Unit Citation Badge for the same action, dated October 12, 1984.
USS Laffey (DD-724)	U.S. Navy	1945	Battle of Okinawa	"For extraordinary heroism in action as a Picket Ship on Radar Picket Station during a coordinated attack by approximately twenty-five Japanese aircraft near Okinawa on May 3, 1945. Shooting down two Kamikazes which approached in determined suicide dives, the U.S.S. Laffey was struck by a bomb from a third suicide plane as she fought to destroy this attacker before it crashed into her superstructure and sprayed the entire area with flaming gasoline. Instantly flooded in her after engine room and fireroom, she battled against flames and exploding ammunition on deck and, maneuvering in a tight circle because of damage to her steering gear, countered another coordinated suicide attack and destroyed three Kamikazes in rapid succession. Still smoking heavily and maneuvering radically, she lost all power when her forward fireroom flooded under a seventh suicide plane which dropped a bomb close aboard and dived in flames into the main deck. Unable to recover from this blow before an eighth bomber crashed into her superstructure bulkhead only a few seconds later, she attempted to shoot down a ninth Kamikaze diving toward her at high speed and, despite the destruction of nearly all her gun mounts aft when this plane struck her, took under fire the tenth bomb-laden plane, which penetrated the dense smoke to crash on board with a devastating explosion. With fires raging uncontrolled, ammunition exploding and all engine spaces except the forward engine room flooded as she settled in the water and listed to port, she began a nightlong battle to remain afloat and, with the assistance of a towing vessel, finally reached port the following morning. By her superb fighting spirit and the courage and determination of her entire company, the Laffey upheld the finest traditions of the United States Naval Service."
USS Laffey (DD-459)	U.S. Navy	1942	Naval Battle of Guadalcanal	Shortly after midnight on 13 November 1942, at the start of the Naval Battle of Guadalcanal, the destroyer USS Laffey was crippled early in the battle yet engaged two Japanese battleships and two destroyers at point-blank range. At one point Laffey was so close to the battleship Hiei that she was able to use her machine guns to cause critical damage to the control and communication systems on the bridge of the battleship, wound her commanding officer Admiral Hiroaki Abe, and kill Abe's chief of staff. Before she herself was sunk in the battle, Laffey contributed to the sinking of a cruiser and two destroyers.
USS Queenfish (SS-393)	U.S. Navy	1944	U.S. submarine campaign against the Japanese Empire	For Patrols 1 and 2. Charles Elliott Loughlin in command.
USS Nicholas (DD-449)	U.S. Navy	1943	Battle of Kula Gulf	"For outstanding performance in action against enemy Japanese forces off Kolombangara Island, New Georgia Group, Solomon Islands, on the night of July 5–6, 1943. After waging a vigorous battle as part of the small Task Force which destroyed a superior Japanese surface force, the NICHOLAS remained behind with an accompanying destroyer to save the survivors of the torpedoed U.S.S. HELENA. Forced to clear the area on three occasions during rescue operations, she gallantly fought off continuing attacks by Japanese warships emerging from Kula Gulf and, with the other destroyer, sank or damaged an enemy light cruiser and two destroyers with deadly torpedo and gunfire, returning to the area after each onslaught to complete the heroic rescue of more than seven hundred survivors. The valorous achievements of the NICHOLAS reflect great credit upon the United States Naval Service."
LCT-540	U.S. Navy	1944	Operation Overlord	"The Secretary of the Navy Washington The President of the United States takes pleasure in presenting the PRESIDENTIAL UNIT CITATION to the UNITED STATES LCT 540 For service as set forth in the following: Citation: For outstanding performance and distinguished service in combat during the assault on the Coast of Normandy, France, launched June 6, 1944. Rocked by the blasts of German 88-mm. Cannon during the approach, her gun turrets wrecked, fires blazing aboard, her Officer-in-Charge killed and eight of her men casualties, the U.S. LCT 540 hit the beach on schedule under the heaviest concentration of enemy fire. In gallant response to the urgency of her task, she operated twenty-four hours a day until June 9, beaching her cargo while still under fire and returning repeatedly to place ashore the equipment, supplies and troops vital to the success and the very life of our assault forces. Crippled but undaunted, the LCT pursued her course unwaveringly despite German-emplaced underwater obstacles and terrific gunfire opposition, supplementing the valor and fortitude of her inexperienced officer and her men by her own steadfastness in the fulfillment of a perilous mission. For the President James Forrestal Secretary of the Navy"

==== Marine Corps ====
Unit	Service	Year awarded	Campaign or battle	Notes
3rd Marines, Reinforced, serving as 3rd Combat team, 3rd Marine Division consisting of 3rd Marine Regiment, 2nd Battalion, 9th Regiment; Company "C", 3rd Tank Battalion: Company "C", 19th Marine Regiment (Combat Engineers), and 3rd Band Section Regiment (United States)	U.S. Marine Corps	July 21 to August 10, 1944	Battle of Guam	Navy Citation..."For extraordinary heroism in action against enemy Japanese forces during the invasion and recapture of Guam, Mariana Islands, from July 21 to August 10, 1944. Crossing a 400-yard reef under frontal and flanking fire from strongly defended positions on dominating terrain, the 3rd Marine Regiment (Reinforced), serving as the 3rd Combat Team, assaulted the steep slopes of the objective and by evening has captured Adelupe Point and Chonito Cliff. With no reserve available to be committed in their zone of action during the ensuing 8 days, the gallant officers and men of this team fought their way forward through a maze of hostile caves and pillboxes and over rugged terrain to secure Fonte Canyon and the northeastern slopes of Fonte Ridge despite constant mortar, machine-gun, small-arms and artillery fire which blasted all echelons, shore party and lines of communication and supply. Seriously depleted by heavy casualties, including two battalion commanders, the 3rd Combat Team was continually in action as the left assault regiment until the cessation of organized resistance and the securing of the island on August 10, after 21 days of furious combat. By their effective teamwork, aggressive fighting spirit and individual acts of heroism and daring, the men of the 3rd Combat Team achieved an illustrious record of courage and skill in keeping with the highest traditions of the United States Naval Service."
VMA-214 and 213	U.S. Marine Corps	1944		the Black Sheep Squadron—for their second combat tour, lasting 84 days at the end of 1943
2nd Marine Division	U.S. Marine Corps	20–24 November 1943	Battle of Tarawa	Navy Citation... "For outstanding performance in combat during the seizure and occupation of the Japanese-held Atoll of Tarawa, Gilbert Islands, November 20 to 24, 1943."
Wake Det, 1st Defense Bn and VMFA 211	U.S. Marine Corps	8–22 Dec 1941	Wake Island	
MAG 22 and VMF-221	U.S. Marine Corps	Jun 1942	Midway Island	
1st Marine Division	U.S. Marine Corps	7 August-9 December 1942	Solomon Islands	Under command of Major General Alexander A. Vandergrift, USMC Citation: "The officers and enlisted men of the First Marine Division, Reinforced, from August 7 to December 9, 1942, demonstrated outstanding gallantry and determination in successfully executing forced landings assaults against a number of strongly defended Japanese positions on Tulagi, Gavutu, Tanambogo, Florida and Guadalcanal, British Solomon Islands, completely routing all the enemy forces and seizing a most valuable base and airfield within the enemy zone of operations in the South Pacific Ocean. During the above period this Reinforced Division not only held their important strategic positions despite determined and repeated Japanese naval, air and land attacks, but by a series of offensive operations against strong enemy resistance drove the Japanese from the proximity of the airfield and inflicted great losses on them by land and air attacks. The courage and determination displayed in these operations were of an inspiring order." – Frank Knox, Secretary of the Navy.
VMFA-214	U.S. Marine Corps	7 April 1943 17 July – 30 August 1943 16 September – 19 October 1943 17 December 1943 – 6 January 1944	Battle of Guadalcanal, Munda, North Solomons, Vella Lavella and Torokina	
2nd Marine Division	U.S. Marine Corps	20–24 November 1943	Tarawa	
4th Marine Division (Reinforced)	U.S. Marine Corps	15 June-1 August 1944	Battle of Saipan, Battle of Tinian and Battle of Iwo Jima	
1st Marine Division	U.S. Marine Corps	15–19 September 1944	Battle of Peleliu and Negesebus	
VMFA-124 and 213	U.S. Marine Corps	16 Feb-11 May 1943 and 3–22 January 1945	USS Essex, Philippines, Formosa, South China Sea	
VMFA 211 and VMFA 451	U.S. Marine Corps	16 February −11 May 1945	USS Bunker Hill, Japan, Bonins, and Ryukyu Islands	
V Amphibious Corps (composed of landing forces from 3rd, 4th and 5th Marine Divisions)	U.S. Marine Corps	19–28 February 1945	Iwo Jima	The assault troop units of the three Marine Divisions, operating under the command structure of V Amphibious Corps, earned a collective Presidential Unit Citation. (The support troop units of those same Marine Divisions, also within V Amphibious Corps, earned a collective Navy Unit Commendation for the same battle.)
1st Marine Division (Reinforced)	U.S. Marine Corps	1 April-21 June 1945	Okinawa	"... Securing its assigned area in the north of Okinawa by a series of lightning advances against stiffening resistance, the FIRST Marine Division, Reinforced, turned southward to drive steadily forward through a formidable system of natural and manmade defenses protecting the main enemy bastion at Shuri Castle. Laying bitter siege to the enemy until the defending garrison was reduced and the elaborate fortifications at Shuri destroyed, these intrepid Marines continued to wage fierce battle as they advanced relentlessly, cutting off the Japanese on Oroku Peninsula and smashing through a series of heavily fortified, mutually supporting ridges extending to the southernmost tip of the island to split the remaining hostile force into two pockets where they annihilated the trapped and savagely resisting enemy...."
6th Marine Division (Reinforced)	U.S. Marine Corps	1 April-21 June 1945	Okinawa	"For extraordinary heroism in action against enemy Japanese forces during the assault and capture of Okinawa, April 1 to June 21, 1945. Seizing Yontan Airfield in its initial operation, the SIXTH Marine Division, Reinforced, smashed through organized resistance to capture Ishikawa Isthmus, the town of Nago and heavily fortified Motobu Peninsula in 13 days. Later committed to the southern front, units of the Division withstood overwhelming artillery and mortar barrages, repulsed furious counterattacks and staunchly pushed over the rocky terrain to reduce almost impregnable defenses and capture Sugar Loaf Hill. Turning southeast, they took the capital city of Naha and executed surprise shore-to-shore landings on Oroku Peninsula, securing the area with its prized Naha Airfield and Harbor after nine days of fierce fighting. Reentering the lines in the south, SIXTH Division Marines sought out enemy forces entrenched in a series of rocky ridges extending to the southern tip of the island, advancing relentlessly and rendering decisive support until the last remnants of enemy opposition were exterminated and the island secured..."
2nd MAW	U.S. Marine Corps	4 April-14 July 1945	Okinawa	"... Bearing the entire burden of land-based aircraft support during the early part of the Okinawa Campaign, the Second Marine Aircraft Wing established facilities and operated its aircraft under the most hazardous field conditions with a minimum of equipment and personnel. Undeterred by either the constant rain during April and May or by heavy enemy artillery shelling and repeated day and night aerial bombing of the air strips, the unit succeeded in carrying out highly effective aerial operations against the enemy from Kyushu to the southernmost islands of the Ryukyu Group, flying picket-ship and anti-submarine patrols, fighter sweeps, day and night fighter and bomber strikes, reconnaissance and search missions, escort missions, and minesweeper and photographic plane cover, in addition to paradrop missions to move essential supplies to our forces. Blasting night and day at the enemy's dug-in infantry and artillery positions and executing some of the most successful night fighter operations of the Pacific War, the unit furnished close air support for our ground forces, shooting down 495 Japanese planes during this period, A gallant, fighting unit..."
Marine Observation Squadron 3	U.S. Marine Corps	2 April- 21 June 1945	Okinawa	"... The first aviation squadron to land on and operate from Yontan Airfield, Marine Observation Squadron THREE assisted in preparing a landing strip on the field while under enemy fire and, during the first nine days of the operation, provided that field with the only available fire, crash and ambulance service. Despite inclement weather, intense enemy antiaircraft fire and constant bombing of its operational field, this squadron rendered invaluable service for more than two months, conducting extremely low-altitude searches, spotting and photographic missions over organized enemy positions to furnish thorough observation for all the Marine artillery units on Okinawa, serving as many as fourteen battalions during some periods. Though reduced in number by enemy action and operational losses, Marine Observation Squadron THREE effectively pursued its mission throughout a hazardous campaign and, by the indomitable courage and excellent teamwork of its officers and men, contributed immeasurably to the destruction of the Japanese on Okinawa."
Marine Aircraft Group 12	U.S. Marine Corps	3 December 1944 – 9 March 1945	Philippine Islands	

=== Korean War ===
==== Air Force ====
Unit	Service	Year awarded	Campaign or battle	Notes
452d Bomb Wing	U.S. Air Force	First: 9 Jul – 27 Nov 1951; Second: 28 Nov 1951 – 30 Apr 1952	Korean War	The 452d Bomb Wing was a composite combat reserve wing stationed at Long Beach California called to serve in the Korean War. It was composed of men from both the 452d and the 448th Bomb Wings many of whom had served during World War II. With aircrew flying in re-conditioned Douglas B-26 Invader light bombers and ground crew maintaining them in combat readiness, the Wing was cited two times during the Korean War for its intrepid action under difficult circumstances. The unit was called to active duty 10 August 1950 and released from active duty in May 1952. During its period of active duty, it flew over 15,000 combat sorties, at a high cost of personnel and aircraft. 85 men and 39 aircraft never returned.
6147th TCS	U.S. Air Force	First: Approx. Jun 1950 – Nov 1950	Korean War	The 6147 Tactical Control Squadron directed the Air Strikes in Korea. With aircrew flying in the venerable North American T-6 Texan light trainer and ground crew maintaining them in combat readiness, the Squadron was cited 4FEB1951 during the Korean War for its directing airstrikes to aid the US/UN troops. The unit made use of an innovative radio system that revolutionized Tactical Air Control.

==== Marine Corps ====
Unit	Service	Year awarded	Campaign or battle	Notes
1st Provisional Marine Brigade	U.S. Marine Corps	7 August-7 September 1950	Korean War	
1st Marine Division	U.S. Marine Corps	15 September-11 October 1950	Battle of Inchon, Korean War	
1st Marine Division	U.S. Marine Corps	27 November-11 December 1950	Battle of Chosin Reservoir, Korean War	
1st Marine Division	U.S. Marine Corps	21–26 April, 16 May- 30 June and 11–25 September 1951 all one award	Korean War	
VMO 6	U.S. Marine Corps	2 August 1950– 27 July 1953	Korean War	
VMF 214 and VMF 323	U.S. Marine Corps	3–6 August, 8–14 September, 12 October-26 November 1950 and 15 December 50–1 August 1951 all one award	Korean War	
1st Marine Aircraft Wing	U.S. Marine Corps	18 March-30 June, 3 August-29 September 1951 all one award	Korean War	
VMF 214 and VMF 323	U.S. Marine Corps	3–6 August, 8–14 September, 12 October-26 November 1950 and 15 December 50–1 August 1951 all one award	Korean War	
1st Marine Aircraft Wing	U.S. Marine Corps	18 March-30 June, 3 August-29 September 1951 all one award	Korean War	

==== Army ====
Unit	Service	Year awarded	Campaign or battle	Notes
Co A, 5th Infantry & Secti 1, Machinegun Plt, Co D, 5th Infantry	U.S. Army	1953	Songnae-dong	Army citation
1st Battalion, 43rd Air Defense Art.	U.S. Army		Nam River	Army citation
1st Battalion, 43rd Air Defense Art.	U.S. Army		Pakchon	Army citation
1st Battalion, 43rd Air Defense Art.	U.S. Army		Wonju-Hwachon	
2nd Infantry Division	U.S. Army	1951	Korean War	
1st Battalion, 7th Infantry	U.S. Army	1951	CHOKSONG	September 1951 Department of the Army General Order No 79 – DISTINGUISHED UNIT CITATION. – The 1st Battalion, 7th Infantry Regiment, 3d Infantry Division, and the following attached units: Intelligence and Reconnaissance Platoon, Headquarters and Headquarters Company,7th Infantry Regiment, 1st Platoon, Medical Company, 7th Infantry Regiment; 3d Platoon, Heavy Tank Company, 7th Infantry Regiment;1st Platoon, Heavy Mortar Company, 7th Infantry Regiment, are cited for outstanding performance of duty and extraordinary heroism in action against an armed enemy near Choksong, Korea, during the period 23 to 25 April 1951. On the morning of 23 April, the 1st Battalion was given the mission of cleaning out enemy pockets in the rear and on the right and left flanks of the 29th British Independent Brigade. After fighting fiercely the entire day, the battalion was ordered to attack an enemy force estimated to be composed of two regiments which had forced the withdrawal of friendly troops resulting in the entrapment of the Belgian United Nations Battalion. Under intense enemy small-arms, automatic-weapons, mortar, and artillery fire, the battalion launched a night attack which was pressed with such aggressiveness, determination, and skill that the enemy was required to commit his entire force to meet the onslaught, thereby relieving pressure on the Belgian Battalion and allowing them to withdraw all equipment and vehicles. Following the withdrawal of the Belgian Battalion, and although surrounded on three sides by enemy troops, the 1st Battalion immediately started a brilliantly executed disengagement. The 1st Battalion inflicted such staggering losses on the enemy that he was unable to continue action in that area. On the afternoon of 24 April, the battalion, after a movement of some 15 miles, took up positions of the 7th Infantry Regiment's main line of resistance with the mission of holding a sector of this line. During the night of 24–25 April, the enemy hurled the might of two whole divisions against the 7th Infantry Regiment's front. Although the enemy had succeeded In infiltrating to the rear of the battalion and its right Bank was completely exposed, the 1st Battalion and attached units fought with magnificent tenacity and courage, holding in line until all other units of the 3d Infantry Division had withdrawn. When ordered, the battalion withdrew under a series of enemy attacks. This gallant unit killed over 3,000 enemy troops and wounded an estimated 5,500 of the enemy. The 1st Battalion, 7th Infantry Regiment, 3d Infantry Division, and attached units displayed such gallantry, determination, skill, and esprit de corps in accomplishing their mission under extremely difficult and hazardous conditions as to set them apart and above other units participating In the action, and reflect great credit on each courageous soldier thereof and the military service of. the United States. (General Orders 560, Headquarters, Eighth United States Army, Korea, 19 July 1951.)
2d Battalion, 7th Infantry & 2d Battalion, 15th Infantry	U.S. Army	1952	KOWANG-NI	July 1952 Department of the Army General Order No 71 DISTINGUISHED UNIT CITATION – The 2d Battalion, 7th Infantry, and the 2nd Battalion, 15th Infantry, 3d Infantry Division, and the following attached units: 1st Platoon, Tank Company, 7th Infantry; 3d Platoon, Tank Company, 7th Infantry; 2d Platoon, Heavy Mortar Company, 7th Infantry; Intelligence and Reconnaissance Platoon, 7th Infantry; Battle Patrol, Headquarters and Headquarters Company, 7th Infantry; Counterfire Platoon, Headquarters and Headquarters Company, 7th Infantry; 2d Medical Platoon, Medical Company, 7th Infantry; 2d Littler Section, Medical Company, 7th Infantry; 2d Ambulance Section, Medical Company, 7th Infantry; 2d Wire Team, Communications Platoon, Headquarters and Headquarters Company, 15th Infantry; 2d Platoon, Heavy Mortar Company, 15th Infantry; Antitank Mine Platoon, 15th Infantry; Liaison Section 2, Headquarters and Headquarters Battery, 10th Field Artillery Battalion; Forward Observation Teams 35, 36, and 37, Battery B, 10th Field Artillery Battalion; Liaison Section 2, Headquarters and Headquarters Battery, 39th Field Artillery Battalion; Forward Observation Teams 35, 36, and 37, Battery B, 39th Field Artillery Battalion; are cited for outstanding performance of duty and extraordinary heroism in action against the enemy in the vicinity of Kowang-ni, Korea, during the period 23 to 25 November 1951. On 23 November, the 2d Battalion, 7th Infantry, moved into defensive positions on a hill which was of vital importance to the ceasefire talks then in progress. Soon after assuming responsibility for this sector, the battalion was subjected to a heavy barrage of mortar and artillery fire as a prelude to a full-scale enemy attack. Shortly thereafter, an estimated two regiments of the enemy were observed moving frantically through their own supporting fire in an assault against the friendly positions. Wave after wave of the hostile troops came charging up the slope, only to be beaten back by the heavy fire poured into their ranks by the friendly force. The enemy, determined to take their objective at all costs, concentrated five battalions at one sector of the defense line and, under this tremendous pressure, one of the friendly companies was forced to execute a limited withdrawal to save itself from total annihilation, Although masses of the enemy were hurling themselves at the entire friendly line, the defenders, fighting fiercely against heavy odds, held them back except for this single penetration, The 2d Battalion, 15th Infantry, was immediately ordered to move forward and block the hostile troops attempting to push through the gap in the defense line. Upon reaching the area, one company immediately launched a spirited counterattack. Despite the heavy fire pouring down on them from all sides, the friendly troops pushed the enemy back steadily until the heavy casualties inflicted on them by the numerically superior hostile force made it necessary for them to halt their advance and occupy defensive positions on a newly won ridge. Another friendly company quickly moved through these positions and continued the attack until the enemy was repulsed and the breach in the friendly defense was closed. At this point, a fresh assault company advanced through the other two, who were in the process of consolidating their positions, and drove the enemy completely from the area with heavy casualties. The hostile force immediately launched a fierce counterattack but the friendly troops, exhibiting a matchless fighting spirit, repulsed the enemy repeatedly. Finally, seriously weakened by the tremendous casualties they had suffered, the hostile troops retreated, completely frustrated in their attempt to force the friendly troops from the strategic hill. In this action, approximately 2,000 of the enemy were killed, approximately 8,000 wounded, and 8 taken prisoner. The 2d Battalion, 7th Infantry, and the 2d Battalion, 15th Infantry, 3d Infantry Division, and attached units displayed such superlative effectiveness in accomplishing their mission under extremely difficult and hazardous conditions as to set them apart and above other units participating in the action. The extraordinary heroism, singleness of purpose, and esprit de corps exhibited by the members of these units reflect great credit on themselves and are in keeping with the most esteemed traditions of the military service. (General Orders 259. Headquarters, Eighth United States Army. Korea, 21 May 1952)
3rd Battalion, 7th Infantry	U.S. Army	1952	SEGOK (Hill 717)	March 1952 Department of the Army General Order 33 DISTINGUISHED UNIT CITATION – The 3d Battalion (second award for Company L only), 7th Infantry Regiment, 3d Infantry Division, and the following attached units :3d Platoon, Medical Company, 7th Infantry Regiment; 1st Platoon, Heavy Mortar Company, 7th Infantry Regiment (second award); 2d Platoon, Heavy Tank Company, 7th Infantry Regiment; 3d Platoon, Heavy Tank Company, 7th Infantry Regiment (second award); Liaison Section 244, Headquarters Battery, 39th Field Artillery Battalion; Forward Observer Sections 1, 2, and 3, Battery B, 89th Field Artillery Battalion, are cited for outstanding performance of duty and extraordinary heroism inaction against the enemy near Segok, Korea, during the period 30 June to 4 July 1951. On the evening of 30 June, the 3d Battalion and attached units commenced their assigned mission which was to attack and seize Hill 717, the commanding terrain feature of the Chorwon-Kumhwa-Pyonggang area. A previous attempt by a friendly battalion to secure this vital objective had been unsuccessful because of the numerical superiority of the enemy force. Advancing nearly 7,000 yards (6,400 m) over rugged and uncertain terrain in darkness, while continually under intense enemy small-arms, automatic-weapons, artillery, and mortar fire, the battalion and attached units moved up the precipitous slopes and pressed the attack with such aggressiveness, determination, and skill that the enemy was forced to abandon carefully prepared entrenchments. Throughout the night of 1 July, the hostile force savagely counterattacked, attempting to dislodge the battalion and attached units from their precarious positions on the slopes of Hill 717. On the morning of 2 July, the battalion and attached units resumed their assault against the enemy's fortified hill positions. Even though they had suffered severely from the previous night's engagement, these gallant units, imbued with a steadfast determination, continued to advance against vast numbers of the enemy, inflicting staggering losses on the hostile force. To supplement its seriously depleted force, the enemy was forced to commit additional reserves to prevent the seizure of this important hill by the friendly forces. The battle continued to rage throughout the night of 2 July, with the enemy force hurling its entire might against the 3d Battalion and attached units, repeatedly charging down on the friendly forces in suicidal waves. In the face of tremendous odds, the valiant members of these units engaged the enemy in hand-to-hand combat with such magnificent tenacity and courage that their positions remained intact and the enemy was repulsed with heavy casualties. The fierce battle went on until, late in the afternoon of 3 July, the stubbornly resisting hostile force was routed from its strongly defended hilltop emplacements. After repulsing several enemy counterattacks during the night, the positions of the friendly units were consolidated on 4 July. Throughout this heroic engagement, more than 1,500 casualties were inflicted on the hostile troops. The 3d Battalion, 7th Infantry Regiment, 3d Infantry Division, and attached units displayed such gallantry, determination, and esprit de corps in accomplishing their mission under extremely difficult and hazardous conditions as to set them apart and above other units participating in the action. The extraordinary heroism displayed by all members of these units reflects great credit on themselves and upholds the highest traditions of the military service. (General Orders 769, Headquarters, Eighth United States Army, Korea, 15 October 1951.)
"A" Company, 72nd Heavy Tank Battalion	U.S. Army	22 April to 25 April 1951	Kapyong	

==== United Nations Forces ====
Unit	Service	Year awarded	Campaign or battle	Notes
3rd Battalion, Royal Australian Regiment	Australian Army	22 April to 25 April 1951	Kapyong	Only 3rd Battalion permitted to carry DUC streamer on Regimental Colour. Citation reads: GENERAL ORDER number 453, 23 June 1951 AWARD OF DISTINGUISHED UNIT CITATION, the following units are cited as public evidence of deserved honor and distinction: 3RD BATTALION, ROYAL AUSTRALIAN REGIMENT 2ND BATTALION, PRINCESS PATRICIA'S CANADIAN LIGHT INFANTRY COMPANY A, 72ND HEAVY TANK BATTALION (UNITED STATES) are cited for extraordinary heroism and outstanding performance of combat duties in action against the armed enemy near Kapyong, Korea, on 24 and 25 April 1951. The enemy had broken through the main line of resistance and penetrated to the area north of Kapyong. The units listed above were deployed to stem the assault. The 3rd Battalion, Royal Australian Regiment, moved to the right flank of the sector and took up defensive positions north of the Pukham River. The 2nd Battalion, Princess Patricia's Canadian Light Infantry, defended in the vicinity of Hill 677 on the left flank. Company A, 72nd Heavy Tank Battalion, supported all units to the full extent of its capacity and, in addition, kept the main roads open and assisted in evacuating the wounded. Troops from a retreating division passed through the sector which enabled enemy troops to infiltrate with the withdrawing forces. The enemy attacked savagely under the clamor of bugles and trumpets. The forward elements were completely surrounded going through the first day and into the second. Again and again the enemy threw waves of troops at the gallant defenders, and many times succeeded in penetrating the outer defenses, but each time the courageous, indomitable, and determined soldiers repulsed the fanatical attacks. Ammunition ran low and there was no time for food. Critical supplies were dropped by air to the encircled troops, and they stood their ground in resolute defiance of the enemy. With serene and indefatigable persistence, the gallant soldiers held their defensive positions and took heavy tolls of the enemy. In some instances when the enemy penetrated the defenses, the commanders directed friendly artillery fire on their own positions in repelling the thrusts. Toward the close of 25 April, the enemy breakthrough had been stopped. The seriousness of the breakthrough on the central front had been changed from defeat to victory by the gallant stand of these heroic and courageous soldiers. The 3rd Battalion, Royal Australian Regiment; 2nd Battalion, Princess Patricia's Canadian Light Infantry; and Company A, 72nd Heavy Tank Battalion, displayed such gallantry, determination, and esprit de corps in accomplishing their missions under extremely difficult and hazardous conditions as to set them apart and above other units participating in the campaign, and by their achievements they brought distinguished credit on themselves, their homelands, and all freedom-loving nations. BY COMMAND OF LIEUTENANT GENERAL VAN FLEET Leven C. Allen Major General U.S. Army Chief of Staff
2nd Battalion, Princess Patricia's Canadian Light Infantry	Canadian Army	22 April to 25 April 1951	Kapyong	Only 2nd Battalion permitted to carry DUC streamer on Regimental Colour (see above for full citation, simultaneously awarded to 3rd Battalion, Royal Australian Regiment as well).
1st Battalion, Gloucestershire Regiment	British Army	23rd, 24th, and 25 April 1951	Battle of the Imjin River	The citation reads as follows:- The 1ST BATTALION GLOUCESTERSHIRE REGIMENT, BRITISH ARMY and TROOP C, 170TH INDEPENDENT MORTAR BATTERY, ROYAL ARTILLERY, attached, are cited for exceptionally outstanding performance of duty and extraordinary heroism in action against the armed enemy near Solma-ri, Korea on the 23rd, 24th and 25 April 1951. The 1st BATTALION and TROOP C were defending a very critical sector of the battle front during a determined attack by the enemy. The defending units were overwhelmingly outnumbered. The 83rd Chinese Communist Army drove the full force of its savage assault at the positions held by the 1st BATTALION, GLOUCESTERSHIRE REGIMENT and attached unit. The route of supply ran Southeast from the battalion between two hills. The hills dominated the surrounding terrain northwest to the Imjin River. Enemy pressure built up on the battalion front during the day 23 April. On 24 April the weight of the attack had driven the right flank of the battalion back. The pressure grew heavier and heavier and the battalion and attached unit were forced into a perimeter defense on Hill 235. During the night, heavy enemy forces had by-passed the staunch defenders and closed all avenues of escape. The courageous soldiers of the battalion and attached unit were holding the critical route selected by the enemy for one column of the general offensive designed to encircle and destroy 1st Corps. These gallant soldiers would not retreat. As they were compressed tighter and tighter in their perimeter defense, they called for close-in air strikes to assist in holding firm. Completely surrounded by tremendous numbers, these indomitable, resolute, and tenacious soldiers fought back with unsurpassed fortitude and courage. As ammunition ran low and the advancing hordes moved closer and closer, these splendid soldiers fought back viciously to prevent the enemy from overrunning the position and moving rapidly to the south. Their heroic stand provided the critically needed time to regroup other 1st Corps units and block the southern advance of the enemy. Time and again efforts were made to reach the battalion, but the enemy strength blocked each effort. Without thought of defeat or surrender, this heroic force demonstrated superb battlefield courage and discipline. Every yard of ground they surrendered was covered with enemy dead until the last gallant soldier of the fighting battalion was over-powered by the final surge of the enemy masses. The 1st BATTALION, GLOUCESTERSHIRE REGIMENT and TROOP C, 170th INDEPENDENT MORTAR BATTERY displayed such gallantry, determination, and esprit de corps in accomplishing their mission under extremely difficult and hazardous conditions as to set them apart and above other units participating in the same battle. Their sustained brilliance in battle, their resoluteness, and extraordinary heroism are in keeping with the finest traditions of the renowned military forces of the British Commonwealth, and reflect unsurpassed credit on these courageous soldiers and their homeland.
Belgian United Nations Command	Belgian Army Luxembourg Army	23rd, 24th, and 25 April 1951	Battle of the Imjin River	Known as the Belgian and Luxembourg Volunteer Corps For Koriea. Belgium and Luxembourg's Corps (Corps Volontaires Coree) comprised over 900 troops at the time. The 1st Belgium Battalion (1eme Bataillon Belge) arrived in January 1951 and was attached to the U.S. 3rd Infantry Division in January 1951. It was replaced by the 2nd Belgium Battalion (2eme Bataillon Belge) in August 1951, which remained in Korea until June 1955. A 44-man all volunteer platoon from Grand Duchy of Luxembourg served with the Belgium troops until 1953.
Troop C. 170th Independent Mortar Battery, Royal Artillery	British Army	23rd, 24th, and 25 April 1951	Battle of the Imjin River	now 170 (Imjin) Battery, 12th Regiment Royal Artillery
Nederlands Detachement Verenigde Naties (Netherlands Detachment United Nations)	Royal Netherlands Army	February 1951 and May–June 1951	Wonju and Hoengson & the Soyang River Battle	Designated a battalion of a newly formed regiment, known as the Regiment Van Heutsz.
2 Squadron SAAF	South African Air Force	November 1950 to December 1953	Korean War	During the war the squadron flew a total of 12,067 sorties, most being dangerous ground attack missions, accounting for the loss of 34 pilots and 2 other ranks. 74 of the 94 P-51 Mustangs and 4 out of the 22 F-86 Sabres were lost.
Turkish Armed Forces Command (TAFC)	Turkish Army	25–26 January 1951	Battle of Kumyangjang-Ni	The Turkish Brigade, a member of the United Nations Forces in Korea was cited for exceptionally outstanding performance of duty in combat in the area of Kumyangjang-ni, Korea, from 25 to 27 January 1951.
Greek Expeditionary Force battalion (Royal Hellenic Battalion)	Hellenic Army	February 1952 and 17–18 June 1953	The capture of Scotch Hill & the defense of Outpost Harry	Known as the Sparta Battalion. 840 soldiers of the Royal Hellenic Battalion arrived in Korea on 9 December 1950. The battalion was assigned to the U.S. 1st Cavalry Division's 7th Cavalry Regiment. Augmented by a second battalion shortly after the Korean War Armistice Agreement, these units returned home in December 1955.
Greek Expeditionary Force Flight 13	Hellenic Air Force	December 1950	Evacuation of US Marines at Hagaru-ri	
Bataillon français de l'ONU (French Battalion of the United Nations Organization)	French Army	February 20, July 11 and August 9, 1951	Actions in Chipyong-Ni	39 officers, 172 non-commissioned officers and more than 800 enlisted personnel arrived at Pusan on 30 November. Equipped with US weapons and vehicles, it was attached to the 23rd Infantry Regiment, 2nd US Division with which it served until the end of hostilities. 3,421 French soldiers served in Korea, of whom 287 were KIA, 1,350 WIA, 7 MIA, and 12 POW.

=== Cold War ===
Unit	Service	Year awarded	Campaign or battle	Notes
USS Parche (SSN-683)	U.S. Navy	1979, 1980, 1981, 1982, 1986, 1993, 1994, 1998, 2004	Official operations are still classified.	The most decorated unit in U.S. Navy history, with a total of nine PUCs awarded during its 30 years of service. Parche's special modifications and extensive research and development duties allowed her to be the premier spy submarine in the US fleet. This earned her the many PUCs, but prevents the release of many of the details involved.
USS Richard B. Russell (SSN-687)	U.S. Navy	1987	Operation Manta/Acetone	Submarine communications cable wiretapping operations while USS Parche underwent hull overhaul.
USS Halibut (SSGN-587)	U.S. Navy	1972	Operation Ivy Bells	Navy Citation. Submarine communications cable wiretapping operations.
USS Flasher (SSN-613)	U.S. Navy	1970		Awarded PUC for having tailed on a Soviet Navy Hotel II ballistic missile submarine undetected for more than twenty days – first long tailing in the Pacific.
USS Lapon (SSN-661)	U.S. Navy	1969		Awarded PUC for having tailed on a Soviet Navy Yankee class ballistic missile submarine undetected for a period of forty-seven days.
USS Halibut (SSGN-587)	U.S. Navy	1968	Operation Sand Dollar	Navy Citation for search mission to locate the sunken Soviet ballistic missile submarine K-129 (Project Azorian).
USS Triton (SSRN-586)	U.S. Navy	1960	Operation Sandblast	Navy Citation for the first submerged circumnavigation made during its shakedown cruise, for 16 February 1960 to 10 May 1960; second peacetime PUC awarded to a unit of the U.S. Navy.
USS Nautilus (SSN-571)	U.S. Navy	1958	Operation Sunshine	Navy Citation for the first submerged voyage under the North Pole, for 22 July 1958 to 5 August 1958; first peacetime PUC awarded to a unit of the U.S. Navy.
6555th ATW	U.S. Air Force	1966	NASA Gemini and USAF Minuteman Programs	AF Citation for support all AF and NASA launches from the Cape. Significant work included the Gemini Launch Program and development of the USAF Minuteman ICBM.

=== Vietnam War ===
Unit	Service	Year awarded	Campaign or battle	Notes
1st Military Intelligence Battalion (ARS)	U.S. Army	23 January 1969	1966–1967	U.S. Air Force Presidential Unit Citation for extraordinary gallantry in connection with military operations from 18 February 1966 to 30 June 1967. Department of the Air Force Special Order GB-36 dated 23 January 1969
460th Tactical Reconnaissance Wing	U.S. Air Force	23 January 1969	1966–1967	For extraordinary gallantry in connection with military operations from 18 February 1966 to 30 June 1967. Department of the Air Force Special Order GB-36 dated 23 January 1969
366th Tactical Fighter Wing	U.S. Air Force		Operation Linebacker I 1 April – 26 June 1972	The 366th Tactical Fighter Wing, Pacific Air Forces distinguished itself by extraordinary heroism in connection with military operations against opposing armed forces in Southeast Asia, from 1 April 1972 to 26 June 1972. During this period, members of the 366th Tactical Fighter Wing, participating in a variety of tactical missions, were responsible for inflicting heavy damage on hostile forces while flying 11,500 sorties in support of United States and Republic of Vietnam forces under attack. In the course of these operations, Wing personnel repeatedly braved intense hostile fire from rockets, mortars, antiaircraft artillery-small arms weapons and surface-to-air missiles. The professionalism, dedication to duty, and extraordinary heroism demonstrated by the members of the 366th Tactical Fighter Wing are in keeping with the finest traditions of the military service and reflect the highest credit upon themselves and the Armed Forces of the United States.
Company D. 4th Battalion, 12th Infantry, 199th Infantry Brigade and Attached Units: Medical Aid Detachment, Battalion Headquarters and Headquarters Company, 4th Battalion 12th Infantry; Forward Observer Team/Battery C, 2nd Battalion 40th Artillery and 1st Platoon, D Troop, 17th Armored Cavalry.	U.S. Army	1969	May Offensive	GENERAL ORDERS NO. 60 HEADQUARTERS DEPARTMENT OF THE ARMY WASHINGTON, DC, 17 OCTOBER 1969: (awarded to these units) who distinguished themselves by extraordinary heroism during the period 5 to 10 May 1968, while engaged in military operations against a hostile force in the Republic of Vietnam. Serving as a blocking element to deny hostile forces approach routes into Saigon and portions of Binh Chanh District, Company D and attached units repeatedly displayed outstanding acts of valor against superior forces in offensive, defensive, and ambush operations. During the period nine major contacts were made with elements of four North Vietnamese Army battalions and in each instance the enemy forces were routed from the battlefield by the aggressive action, teamwork, firepower, spirit, heroism, and outstanding tactics of the combined arms team. Maintaining pressure on the enemy forces to prevent their withdrawal, Company D dispersed and demoralized the units and prevented their reorganization, while killing 181 North Vietnamese Army soldiers and capturing ten prisoners of war, numerous weapons, equipment, and ammunition. Throughout the prolonged period of savage fighting the men of Company D by their relentless determination, undaunted courage and aggressive spirit performed countless acts of heroism as they defeated enemy forces with numerically superior automatic weapons, small arms, mortar and rocket fire. These actions significantly contributed to the overall defense of Saigon. The extraordinary heroism, devotion to duty, and determination of all personnel of Company D and attached units reflect great credit upon themselves, their units and the United States Army. Delta Company is also entitled to the Presidential Unit Citation (Army) Streamer embroidered SAIGON
1st Brigade, 4th Infantry Division and supporting units	U.S. Army	1966	Battle of Dak To and Jackson Hole	Oakleaf Cluster in October and into November 1967, Battle of Dakto the forward 4th Infantry Base Camp and SOG's, Special Forces Camp, and Battle of Kontum, and LZ Jackson Hole, Vietnam.
173rd Airborne Brigade (Separate)	U.S. Army		Battle of Dak To	Nov. 6—25, 1967
3rd Brigade, 101st Airborne Division	U.S. Army		Battle of Dong Ap Bia Mountain	
11th Armored Cavalry Regiment	U.S. Army		Hau Nghia province-Binh Duong province	Tet Offensive near Saigon, Hq. Troop/Air Cavalry Troop, 1st Platoon Gunships (1st Sqdn.), and Troops A, B, C and Company D
11th Armored Cavalry Regiment	U.S. Army	7 November 1969	Duc Hoa, Hau Nghia Province	"3rd Squadron and attached and supporting units, 1st Platoon, Air Cavalry Troop, 11th Armored Cavalry Regiment; 2d Platoon, 919th Engineer Company; Tactical Air Control Party, 19th Tactical Air Support Squadron distinguished themselves by extraordinary heroism in actions against hostile forces in the Republic of Vietnam from 12 March 1968 to 1 April 1968. During this peripd the 3d Squadron conducted continuous offensive operations in the vicinity of Duc Hoa, Hau Nghia Province as part of the South Vietnamese counter-offensive Quet Thang."
11th Armored Cavalry Regiment	U.S. Army	2009	War Zone C, Tay Ninh Province	Troop A, 11th Armored Cavalry for action on 26 March 1970, Troop A volunteered to rescue Company C, 2nd Battalion, 8th Cavalry, 1st Cavalry Division who was surrounded by an overwhelming enemy force near the Cambodian border, in The Dog's Face, in Tay Ninh Province, Republic of Vietnam. Company C was engaged by a battalion of the 272nd Regiment of the North Vietnamese Army which was fighting from a sheltered and fortified bunker complex. The North Vietnamese had resisted hours of air support and artillery fire and was expected to overwhelm Company C, unless they were relieved. Company C's ammunition was running low, and was not mobile due to numerous casualties. A lack of landing zones precluded relief or retreat. Troop A made a 4 km march through difficult jungle terrain to mount a direct assault into the fortified North Vietnamese Army position. Outnumbered three to one, Troop A's attack placed them into close range of the concealed defenders. Despite sustained small-arms, rocket-propelled grenade, and recoilless rifle fire, Troop A rendered the North Vietnamese Army unit combat ineffective. At dusk, following the assault, Troop A executed a night march to evacuate the dead and wounded.
VO-67	U.S. Navy	2007	Battle of Khe Sanh	For extraordinary heroism and outstanding performance of duty in action against enemy forces in the Republic of Vietnam from 15 November 1967 to 2 July 1968. Throughout this period, Observation Squadron SIXTY-SEVEN (VO-67), operating in the Republic of Vietnam, successfully executed its primary mission of providing quick reaction, close air support, and combat logistics support for United States and Vietnamese military forces. In the face of extremely harsh climatic conditions at a remote operating base, while sustaining extensive operating damage and losses, the flight crews and ground support personnel of VO-67 carried out their highly important and extremely sensitive missions with outstanding skill and dedication. The Squadron flew countless missions implanting newly developed sensors to detect enemy movement. The support provided by VO-67 was instrumental in supplying real-time intelligence regarding the movement of North Vietnamese troops and supplies, which enabled U.S. Forces to prevent the total invasion of the U.S. Marine Combat Base at Khe Sanh during the Tet Offensive and contributed to saving countless lives. The squadron's operations were consistently characterized by prudent tactics while maintaining meticulous adherence to the rules of engagement, ensuring maximum deterrence of the enemy with minimum risk to friendly troops and civilians. VO-67' s successful initiation of this new mission provided a significant and vital contribution to the art of warfare. By their outstanding courage, resourcefulness, and aggressive fighting spirit in combat against a frequently well-equipped, well-trained, and often numerically superior enemy, the officers and enlisted personnel of Observation Squadron SIXTY-SEVEN reflected great credit upon themselves and upheld the highest traditions of the United States Naval Service.
USS Kitty Hawk (CVA-63) and Carrier Air Wing Eleven	U.S. Navy	1969	Vietnam War	9 January 1969: The Presidential Unit Citation, covering 23 December 1967 – 1 June 1968, was awarded to the U.S.S. Kitty Hawk and Carrier Air Wing Eleven (CVW-11) for their exceptional performance during the fierce fighting of the enemy's Tet Offensive, in part noting that they "succeeded in inflicting extensive damage and destruction to sites and installations vital to the enemy's operations." ADM Hyland noted during the award ceremony: "The ship is recognized in professional circles as having been on Yankee Station during the toughest part of the war and against the most heavily defended area in the world." Kitty Hawk launched 185 major strikes, 150 of them against northern North Vietnam, hitting the Hanoi and Haiphong areas 65 times. Due to fluid enemy tactics additional emphasis was placed upon "lucrative targets of a fleeting nature."
USS Bon Homme Richard (CVA-31) and Carrier Air Wing Twenty One	U.S. Navy	1972	Vietnam War	By virtue of the authority vested in me as President of the United States and as Commander-in-Chief of the Armed Forces of the United States. I have today awarded THE PRESIDENTIAL UNIT CITATION (NAVY) FOR EXTRAORDINARY HEROISM TO USS BON HOMME RICHARD (CVA-31) and ATTACK CARRIER AIR WING TWENTY-ONE For extraordinary heroism and outstanding performance of duty in Action against enemy forces in Southeast Asia from 26 February to 30 July 1967, in support of United States national policy. During this period of intensive combat operations, BON HOMME RICHARD aircraft carried out numerous day and night strikes against a wide variety of targets in North Vietnam and succeeded in inflicting extensive damage to these targets. BON HOMME RICHARD and her embarked Air Wing continuously overcame determined enemy defenses and hazardous weather conditions to project aggressive, effective naval air power against the enemy. All assigned tasks were accomplished expeditiously and contributed significantly to the combat air effort of the United States in Southeast Asia. The courage, professional competence, and devotion to duty displayed by the officers and men of BON HOMME RICHARD and her embarked Attack Carrier Air Wing TWENTY-ONE reflected great credit upon them selves and were in keeping with the highest traditions of the United States Naval Service. Signed Richard M Nixon
USS Midway (CVA-41) and Carrier Air Wing Five (CVW-5)	U.S. Navy	1973	Vietnam War	The Presidential Unit Citation was awarded to USS Midway and its Carrier Air Wing Five "For extraordinary heroism and outstanding performance of duty in action against enemy forces in Southeast Asia from 30 April 1972 to 9 February 1973. During this crucial period of the Vietnam conflict, USS MIDWAY and embarked Attack CarrierAir Wing FIVE carried out devastating aerial attacks against enemy installations, transportation, and lines of communications in the face of extremely heavy opposition including multi-calibre antiaircraft artillery fire and surface-to-air missiles. Displaying superb airmanship and unwavering courage, MIDWAY/CVW-5 pilots played a significant role in lifting the prolonged sieges at An Loc, Kontum, and Quang Tri and in carrying out the concentrated aerial strikes against the enemy's industrial heartland which eventually resulted in a cease -fire."
MACV	U.S. Army	1971	Tet Offensive	Only Advisor/Liaison Personnel attached to the 3d Armored Cavalry Squadron, Army of the Republic of Vietnam from 1 January 1968 to 30 September 1968. (DAGO 1971–24)
MACV-SOG	Various units	April 4, 2001	Vietnam War	The Studies and Observation Group is cited for extraordinary heroism, great combat achievement and unwavering fidelity while executing unheralded top secret missions deep behind enemy lines across Southeast Asia. Military Assistance Command, Vietnam – Studies and Observations Group and specific assigned or attached units from 24 January 1964 to 30 April 1972. (DAGO-2001-25); U.S. Army: Command and Control Detachment, 5th Special Forces Group, Danang, Republic of Vietnam, 1 January 1965 to 31 December 1968; Special Operations Augmentation, Command and Control North, 5th Special Forces Group, Danang, Republic of Vietnam, 1 January 1968 to 31 December 1971; Task Force One, Advisory Element, U.S. Army Vietnam, Danang, Republic of Vietnam, 1 January 1971 to 30 April 1972; Special Operations Augmentation, Command and Control Central, 5th Special Forces Group, Kontum, Republic of Vietnam, 1 January 1969 to 31 December 1971; Task Force Two, Advisory Element, U.S. Army Vietnam, Kontum, Republic of Vietnam, 1 January 1971 to 30 April 1972; Company E (Provisional), Detachment C-5, 5th Special Forces Group, Ho Ngoc Tao, Republic of Vietnam, 1 June 1967 to 31 October 1967; Project Omega, Detachment B-50, 5th Special Forces Group, Kontum, Republic of Vietnam, 1 June 1967 to 31 October 1967; Project Sigma, Detachment B-56, 5th Special Forces Group, Ho Ngoc Tao, Republic of Vietnam, 1 June 1967 to 31 October 1967; Special Operations Augmentation, Command and Control South, 5th Special Forces Group, Ban Me Thuot, Republic of Vietnam, 1 November 1967 to 1 November 1971; Task Force Three, Advisory Element, U.S. Army Vietnam, Ban Me Thuot, Republic of Vietnam, 2 November 1971 to 30 April 1972; Detachment B-53, 5th Special Forces Group, Camp Long Thanh, Republic of Vietnam, 24 January 1964 to 31 December 1971; Training Center Advisory Element, U.S. Army Vietnam, Camp Long Thanh, Republic of Vietnam, 1 January 1971 to 30 April 1972 U.S. Navy: Naval Advisory Detachment, Danang, Republic of Vietnam; One U.S. Navy EC-121 Aircraft and Crew based at Saigon, Republic of Vietnam U.S. Marine Corps: assigned individually to Studies and Observation Group staffs U.S. Air Force: 1st Flight Detachment, Nha Trang, Republic of Vietnam, 24 January 1964 to 31 December 1971; 15th Air Commando Squadron, Nha Trang, Republic of Vietnam, 1 January 1966 to 15 November 1968; 15th Special Operations Squadron, Nha Trang, Republic of Vietnam, 16 November 1968 to 15 November 1970; 90th Special Operations Squadron, (less non-Studies and Observation Group Pony Express detachment at Nakhon Phanom AFB, Thailand), Nha Trang, Republic of Vietnam, 1 June 1967 to 31 August 1968; 20th Special Operations Squadron, Nha Trang, Republic of Vietnam, 1 November 1968 to 31 March 1972 Joint Service: Headquarters, Military Assistance Command, Vietnam – Studies and Observation Group, Saigon, Republic of Vietnam Republic of Vietnam Air Force: 219th Helicopter Squadron, Danang, Republic of Vietnam
1st Battalion, 5th Infantry Regiment, and attached units: 1st Platoon, Troop A, 3D Squadron, 4th Cavalry; 38th Infantry Platoon (Scout Dog), 3D Platoon, Company A, 65th Engineer Battalion; 1st Platoon, Battery B, 5th Battalion (AW)(SP), 2D Artillery; 5th Section, Battery D, 7th Artillery; 44th Infantry Platoon (Scout Dog), Battery A, 7th Battalion, 11th Artillery	U.S. Army	1969	Ben Cui	18 August 1968 to 20 September 1968 – "The 1st Battalion (Mechanized), 5th Infantry, 25th Infantry Division and its attached units distinguished themselves by extraordinary heroism in combat operations against numerically superior enemy forces in the Republic of Vietnam from 18 August to 20 September 1968. During this period, the 1st Battalion Task Force, through reconnaissance in force, ambush, counterambush, and reaction missions, effectively destroyed a regimental size enemy force and prevented the enemy from seizing the initiative in its "third offensive." The officers and men of the Task Force displayed outstanding bravery, high morale and exemplary spirit de corps in fierce hand-to-hand combat and counteroffensive action against well disciplined, heavily armed and entrenched enemy forces. An example of the outstanding bravery and aggressiveness occurred on 21 August during a reconnaissance in force mission. The lead elements of Company C, 1st Battalion came under heavy mortar, rocket propelled grenade, machine gun and automatic weapons fire. The company deployed against the enemy forces while the scout platoon protected the company flank and prevented reinforcement by a battalion sized enemy unit. Through skillful use of close supporting fires from artillery, helicopter gunship and tactical air, the officers and men of the Task Force repulsed "human wave" counterattacks and defeated a numerically superior enemy force, which left one hundred and eighty-two dead on the battlefield. The individual acts of gallantry, the teamwork and the aggressiveness of the officers and men of the 1st Battalion Task Force continued throughout the period of prolonged combat operations, resulting in the resounding defeat of enemy forces in their operational area. The heroic efforts, extraordinary bravery and professional competence displayed by the men of the 1st Battalion, 5th Infantry and attached units are in the highest tradition of the military service and reflect great credit upon themselves, their units and the Armed Forces of the United States."
9th Marine Regiment	U.S. Marine Corps		Operation Dewey Canyon	2 January 1969 to 18 March 1969 Army PUC.
26th Marine Regiment	U.S. Marine Corps		Battle of Khe Sanh	20 January to 1 April 1968
1st Mobile Communications Group	U.S. Air Force	1969	Vietnam War	1 January 1967 to 15 February 1968
1879th Comminisation Squadron	U.S. Air Force	1969	Vietnam War	21 June 1968 to 30 June 1969 DAFSO GB-939/70
D Company, 6th Battalion, Royal Australian Regiment	Australian Army	1968	Battle of Long Tan	18 August 1966 – 19 August 1966
17th Special Operations Squadron	U.S. Air Force	1969	Vietnam War	1–30 June 1969 Combat in Southeast Asia, 1 June 1969–30 September 1971.
834th Air Division	U.S. Air Force	1969	Battle of Khe Sanh	483rd Tactical Airlift Wing, 535th Tactical Airlift Squadron (C-7A Caribou) received the Navy Presidential Unit Citation and the Air Force Presidential Unit Citation for airlift support of Khe Sanh and other forward bases from January to May 1968.
834th Air Division	U.S. Air Force	1971	Battle of Dak Seang	483rd Tactical Airlift Wing, 535th Tactical Airlift Squadron (C-7A Caribou) received the Air Force Presidential Unit Citation, Special Order GB-613 dated 3 September 1971, for extraordinary gallantry from 1 April 1970 to 30 June 1970 for participation in aerial resupply of the besieged Special Forces Camp at Deak Seang. Nearly all C-7A Caribou's sustained battle damage during this time. Six, 6, C-7A Caribou's and fifteen, 15, airmen were lost during this time due to extreme enemy fire. This amounts to almost one-half of C-7A Caribou losses since the U.S. Air Force took over the C-7A Caribou mission from the U.S. Army in 1967. The primary mission for C-7A Caribou's was to support Special Forces and Special Operations Group missions and bases located throughout South Vietnam, Cambodia, and Laos.
3rd Marine Division	U.S. Marine Corps	8 March 65–15 September 67	Vietnam War	For extraordinary heroism and outstanding performance of duty in action against the North Vietnamese Army and Viet Cong forces in the Republic of Vietnam from 8 March 1965 to 15 September 1967. Throughout this period, the Third Marine Division (Reinforced), operating in the five northernmost provinces of the Republic of Vietnam, successfully executed its three-fold mission of occupying and defending key terrain, seeking out and destroying the enemy, and conducting an intensive pacification program. Operating in an area bordered by over 200 miles of South China Sea coastline, the mountainous Laotian border and the Demilitarized Zone, the Third Marine Division (Reinforced) successfully executed eighty major combat operations, carrying the battle to the enemy, destroying many of his forces, and capturing thousands of tons of weapons and material. In addition to these major operations, more than 125,000 offensive counterguerrilla actions, ranging from squad patrols and ambushes to company-sizes search and destroy operations, were conducted in both the coastal rice lands and the mountainous jungle inland. These bitterly contested actions routed the enemy from his well-entrenched positions, denied him access to his source of food, restricted his freedom of movement, and removed his influence from the heavily populated areas. In numerous operations, the Third marine Division (Reinforced) demonstrated the great efficacy of combined operations with units of the Army of the Republic of Vietnam. In July 1966, the Third marine Division (Reinforced) moved to the north to counter major elements of the North Vietnamese Army moving across the Demilitarized Zone into the province of Quang Tri; its units fought a series of savage battles against the enemy, repeatedly distinguishing themselves and, time and again, forcing the enemy to retreat across the Demilitarized Zone. Imbued with an unrelenting combat spirit and initiative and undeterred by heavy hostile artillery and mortar fire, extremely difficult terrain, incessant heat and monsoon rains, the Third marine Division (Reinforced), employing courageous ground, heliborne and amphibious assaults, complemented by intense and accurate air, artillery and naval gunfire support, inflicted great losses on the enemy and denied him the political and military victory he sought to achieve at any cost. The outstanding courage, resourcefulness and aggressive fighting spirit of the officers and men of the Third marine Division (Reinforced) in battle after battle against a well-equipped and well-trained enemy, often numerically superior in strength, and the great humanitarianism constantly shown to the people of the Republic of Vietnam, reflected great credit upon the Marine Corps and were in keeping with the highest traditions of the United States Naval Service.
1st Marine Division	U.S. Marine Corps	29 March 65–15 September 67	Vietnam War	
1st Marine Aircraft Wing	U.S. Marine Corps	1968	Vietnam War	For extraordinary heroism and outstanding performance of duty in action against the North Vietnamese Army and Viet Gong forces in the Republic of Vietnam, from 11 May 1965 to 15 September 1967. Throughout this period, the First Marine Aircraft Wing, operating in I and II Corps tactical -zones of the Republic of Vietnam, North Vietnam, and adjacent waters, sought out and destroyed determined enemy forces and provided combat air support to ground forces of the Free World and the Republic of Vietnam. Participating in 195 major operations, and thousands of other attacks, the Wing continuously and aggressively carried the battle to the elusive enemy in bitterly contested actions. Operations such as DOUBLE EAGLE, HARVEST MOON, STARLITE, HASTINGS, PRAIRIE, UNION, HICKORY, COCHISE, AND SWIFT, reflect the high degree of superior airmanship, valor, devotion to duty and professionalism exhibited by personnel of the Wing. Although heavily committed to increased combat operations, the Wing developed and successfully employed new weapons, tactics, and procedures against the hard-core communist forces with gratifying results. Through the aggressive actions of the Wing, military and political victories were denied the insurgent communist forces, thereby providing a more stable atmosphere for the legally constituted Government of the Republic of Vietnam. The establishment, and logistical support of many separate airfields throughout the I Corps tactical zone and the vital air supply support provided the III Marine Amphibious Force and its allied ground forces, was a tribute to the resourcefulness and determination of the Wing. This dependable support was provided under the most trying and difficult combat conditions. Flying in fair weather and foul, against a fanatical, well-armed enemy, the uncommon courage and intrepidity of the Marine pilots and supporting Wing personnel, acting in a concerted team effort, contributed to another glorious chapter in an already illustrious history. The valor, devotion to duty, aggressive spirit, professionalism, and ingenuity of the entire First Marine Aircraft Wing in battle against a well trained, dangerous, and determined enemy, reflected the highest degree of heroism and exemplary performance, and were in keeping with the highest traditions of the Marine Corps and the United States Naval Service.
5th Marine Regiment	U.S. Marine Corps	25 April-5 June 67	Vietnam War	
1st Marine Regiment	U.S. Marine Corps	31 January-2 March 68	Vietnam War	
1st Marine Division	U.S. Marine Corps	16 September 67–31 October 68	Vietnam War	
Seal Team One	U.S. Navy	11 November 1968	Vietnam War	THE PRESIDENT of the United States takes pleasure in presenting the PRESIDENTIAL UNIT CITATION TO SEAL TEAM ONE for service as set forth in the following CITATION: For exceptionally meritorious and heroic service from 16 July 1966 to 31 August 1967, in the conduct of naval unconventional warfare operations against the Viet Cong in the Republic of Vietnam. Although often required to carry out their operations in treacherous and almost impenetrable mangrove swamps against overwhelming odds, SEAL TEAM ONE personnel maintained an aggressive operating schedule and were highly successful in gathering intelligence data and in interdicting Viet Cong operations. On one occasion, a six-man fire team ambushed one junk and two sampans, accounting for seven Viet Cong dead and the capture of valuable intelligence data. During this daring ambush, all members of the fire team remained in exposed, waist-deep mud and water in order to obtain clear fields of fire. As a result of their constant alertness and skillful reading of Viet Cong trail markers, patrols of SEAL TEAM ONE succeeded in discovering numerous well-concealed Viet Cong base camps and supply caches, and captured or destroyed over 228 tons of Viet Cong rice, as well as numerous river craft, weapons, buildings, and documents. The outstanding esprit de corps of the men of this unit was evidenced on 7 October 1966 when a direct hit by an enemy mortar round wounded sixteen of the nineteen men aboard the detachment's armed LCM, and again on 7 April 1967 when three members of the SEAL TEAM ONE LCM were killed and eleven were wounded in a fire fight with Viet Cong positioned along the banks of a narrow stream. On both occasions, SEAL TEAM ONE men who were able, even though seriously wounded, returned to their positions and continued to fire their weapons until the boat was out of danger, thereby helping to save the lives of their comrades. The heroic achievements of SEAL TEAM ONE reflect the outstanding professionalism, valor, teamwork, and selfless dedication of the unit's officers and men. Their performance was in keeping with the highest traditions of the United States Naval Service.
1st Marine Regiment	U.S. Marine Corps	20 November-31 December 68	Vietnam War	
Combined Action Program	U.S. Marine Corps	1 January-31 December 68	Vietnam War	
Seal Team Two	U.S. Navy	1970	Vietnam	
Operation Sealords	Various units	1968–1972	Vietnam War	
Operation Swift raiders	Various units	6 December 1968 – 31 March 1969	Vietnam War	
Mobile Riverine Force (Task Force 117)	U.S. Navy	29 January to 4 March 1968	Vietnam War	For exceptionally meritorious and heroic service from 29 January to 4 March 1968 while engaged in armed conflict against communist insurgent (Viet Cong) forces in the Republic of Vietnam. Throughout the Tet (Lunar New Year) Offensive, the Mobile Riverine Force (MRF) was locked in nearly continuous combat as the enemy lay siege to or threatened to attack every large population center and military installation in the Delta. During this hectic, 35-day campaign, the MRF played a vital role in driving the enemy out of My Tho and Vinh Long, the most severely ravaged of all the Delta cities, and in preventing enemy forces from launching sustained attacks on Can Tho, Binh Thuy, Sa Dec, Cai Be, Cai Lay, the Army Base at Đồng Tâm, and many other less populated areas. In every battle, MRF personnel, both individually and collectively, although often matched against forces of much greater size than their own, displayed outstanding courage and professionalism in subduing the Viet Cong challenge. Navy crewmen embarked in Monitors, Command and Communication Boats, Assault Support Patrol Boats, and Armored Troop Carriers were frequently ambushed at point-blank range from concealed positions along both banks of the narrow, jungle-enshrouded Delta streams. In each instance, they succeeded in suppressing the enemy fire before maneuvering their assault craft out of ambush areas. Together, the MRF Army/Navy team successfully met the challenge posed by the Tet Offensive, probably saving the Delta from being overrun by insurgent forces. The gallantry, professionalism, courage under fire, and devotion to duty displayed by the officers and men of the United States Navy Element of the Mobile Riverine Force were in keeping with the highest traditions of the United States Naval Service.
Commander Task Group 194.0 (Units Participating in Operation Sealords)	U.S. Navy	18 October to 5 December 1968	Vietnam War	For extraordinary heroism and outstanding performance of duty from 18 October to 5 December 1968 while engaged in armed conflict against enemy forces in the Republic of Vietnam. Commander Task Group 194.0 initiated and prosecuted the first of several interdiction campaigns to sever enemy lines of communication and resupply and to establish the legal government in areas previously held by the enemy. The naval units engaged in Operation SEA LORDS consistently displayed the striking power and professionalism which were to mark this and following campaigns. Tasked with routing a myriad of enemy forces from their previous sanctuaries, personnel of Commander Task Group 194.0 ventured courageously into little-known canals and back-water areas, fighting valiantly through countless intense enemy rocket and automatic weapons attacks. The naval units, through their persistent and aggressive strikes against enemy strongholds, were eminently successful in their campaign to interdict enemy resupply routes and base areas throughout the lower Mekong Delta region. The courage, professionalism, and dedication displayed by the officers and men of Commander Task Group 194.0 reflected credit upon themselves and were in keeping with the highest traditions of the United States Naval Service.
Commander Task Group 194.9 (Units Participating in Operation Giant Slingshot)	U.S. Navy	6 December 1968 to 31 March 1969	Vietnam War	For extraordinary heroism and outstanding performance of duty from 6 December 1968 to 31 March 1969 while engaged in armed conflict against enemy forces in the Republic of Vietnam. Commander Task Group 194.9 initiated and prosecuted a determined interdiction offensive against the ingress of enemy personnel and war material from Southeast Cambodia into the upper Mekong Delta region of the Republic of Vietnam. The naval units engaged in Operation GIANT SLINGSHOT, including the Riverine Warfare and River Patrol Forces who supplied support, consistently distinguished themselves by their countless deeds of valiant service while carrying out patrols along the narrow, enemy-infested Vam Co, Vam Co Dong, and Vam Co Tay Rivers. Operating with limited logistic support under austere and dangerous conditions, personnel of Commander Task Group 194.9 countered intense rocket and automatic weapons barrages at point-blank range with unshakable determination. As a result of their intrepidity and resolution, the enemy threat was significantly diminished and vital routes of resupply were severed. The quantity of captured enemy war material reached staggering proportions, and the ever-increasing number of enemy casualties attested to the effectiveness of ingeniously developed individual and group offensive tactics. The selfless dedication and inspiring professional performance of the officers and men of Commander Task Group 194.9 reflected credit upon themselves and were in keeping with the highest traditions of the United States Naval Service.
Mobile Riverine Force (Task Force 117)	U.S. Navy	25 January through 5 July 1969	Vietnam War	For extraordinary heroism and outstanding performance of duty from 25 January through 5 July 1969 while engaged in armed conflict against enemy forces in the Mekong Delta region of the Republic of Vietnam. With enemy forces planning to launch a large-scale, winter-spring offensive against Saigon and other cities of the upper Mekong Delta, the ships and assault craft of Task Force 117 provided waterborne mobile support to United States Army, Vietnamese Army, and Vietnamese Marine Corps troops. By riverine assault operations preempting enemy offensive operations, the Force made a significant contribution to thwarting the threat to Saigon and the Mekong Delta. Surprise attacks and routine fire fights on the narrow streams and canals were an almost daily occurrence, while rocket and mining attacks against the Mobile Riverine Bases were an ever-present danger. The courage and determination of Task Force 117 personnel contributed significantly to the successful completion of each Force objective. The skill, fortitude, perseverance, and sustained outstanding performance of the officers and men of the United States Navy Element of the Mobile Riverine Force reflected great credit upon themselves and were in keeping with the highest traditions of the United States Naval Service.
Rung Sat Special Zone River Patrol Group	U.S. Navy	24 June 1969 to 28 February 1970	Vietnam War	For extraordinary heroism and outstanding performance of duty in action against an armed enemy in the Republic of Vietnam from 24 June 1969 to 28 February 1970. During this period, the Rung Sat Special Zone River Patrol Group operated throughout the 405-square-mile maze of rivers, canals, waterways and mangrove swamps of the Rung Sat Special Zone and on the upper Saigon River. When enemy sappers mounted an aggressive offensive against free-world merchant shipping in late spring of 1969, the Rung Sat Special Zone River Patrol Group, in conjunction with South Vietnamese forces, commenced a unique, unrelenting campaign of combined counter-offensive operations. Over two-hundred successful combined operations with United States Army, Air Force and South Vietnamese ground, air and waterborne units were conducted, which routed the enemy from his sanctuaries, denied him access to his source of food, restricted his freedom of movement, and established security for the safe passage of 4,800 free-world merchant ships on the vital Long Tau shipping channel to Saigon. Concurrent with operations in the Rung Sat Special Zone, the task group demonstrated great flexibility and response by initiating counter-offensive operations against threatening enemy forces on the upper Saigon River. Despite extremely limited support facilities, incessant heat, and torrential monsoon rains, units of the task force fought a series of savage battles, repeatedly distinguishing themselves, and inflicted great losses on the enemy, denying him further use of a major infiltration route threatening the city of Saigon. The outstanding courage, resourcefulness, and perseverance displayed by the officers and men of the Rung Sat Special Zone River Patrol Group were in keeping with the highest traditions of the United States Naval Service.
2nd Brigade, 9th Infantry Division, composed of: Headquarters and Headquarters Company, 2d Brigade 3d Battalion, 47th Infantry, 3d Battalion, 60th Infantry, Company C, 4th Battalion, 47th Infantry, 3d Battalion, 34th Artillery	U.S. Army	29 January to 4 March 1968	Vietnam War	The foregoing assigned units of the 2d Brigade, 9th Infantry Division, United States Army component of the Mobile Riverine Force, distinguished themselves by displaying extraordinary heroism in action against an armed hostile force during the Tet Offensive and immediately thereafter from 29 January to 4 March 1968 in the Mekong Delta, Republic of Vietnam. Although the enemy possessed many tactical advantages due to an intimate knowledge of the area and detailed long range planning, his offensive was shattered within 5 weeks of its inception. In the Provincial capital of My Tho, 2d Brigade soldiers fought in a crowded city, an unfamiliar environment for infantry who were trained to fight primarily in a riverine environment. After restoring the security of the western sector of the city, the riverine forces commenced successive operations against enemy movements. At Cai Lai, they disrupted enemy attempts at regrouping. Strikes in and around Vinh Long and My Tho collapsed maturing enemy offensives which threatened these two key cities. Finally the riverine forces moved to the relief of the city of Can Tho, where, in 3 weeks of virtually continuous combat, the heaviest enemy attack of the entire Delta offensive was broken. The 2d Brigade engaged the enemy wherever he could be found and inflicted heavy casualties. The achievements of the riverine forces in turning back the enemy offensive represent a key factor in the operations that saved the Delta. The aggressiveness, determination, and exemplary courage under fire demonstrated by all members of the United States Army component are in the highest traditions of the military service and reflect great credit upon the 2d Brigade, 9th Infantry Division, the Mobile Riverine Force, and the United States Army.
1st Brigade, 9th Infantry Division, composed of: Headquarters and Headquarters Company 2nd Battalion, 39th Infantry-2nd Battalion 60th Infantry, and Attached Units: Company A, 15th Engineer Battalion-1st Battalion, 11th Artillery	U.S. Army	7 March 1968 to 22 June 1968	Vietnam War	The 1st Brigade, 9th Infantry Division, and attached units distinguished themselves by extraordinary heroism in connection with military operations against hostile forces in the Republic of Vietnam during the period 7 March 1968 to 22 June 1968. The 1st Brigade, 9th Infantry Division with attached units reopened and secured Highway 4, the vital link between the Mekong Delta and Saigon, in Dinh Tuong Province and conducted operations against main-force units operating in the area adjacent to Highway 4. In a series of operations, the 1st Brigade, with Company A, 15th Engineer Battalion (Attached) and the 1st Battalion, 11th Artillery in direct support, located and engaged superior enemy forces in some of the most difficult terrain in Vietnam. The swift, decisive and fierce actions of the maneuver and supporting elements annihilated three well equipped and well trained enemy battalions. The 1st Brigade succeeded in driving the Viet Cong from their traditional base areas in central Dinh Tuong Province. During these actions, 629 Viet Cong were killed and 144 captured along with 184 individual and crew served weapons captured and destroyed. The 1st Brigade's success in reopening Highway 4 restored use of this vital communications link to the Vietnamese populace. By their determined display of initiative, professional skill and extraordinary courage, which was in the highest traditions of the military service, the men of the 1st Brigade, 9th Infantry Division and attached units reflected the utmost credit upon themselves, the 9th Infantry Division and the United States Army.
21st Tactical Air Support Squadron	United States Air Force	1 Aug 65 -1 Feb 66; 2 Feb 66–28 Feb 67; 1 Aug 68- 31 Aug 69; 1 Jan 70–31 Dec 70; 30 Jan 71–31 Dec 71	Vietnam War	
716th Military Police Battalion and supporting units	United States Army	1969	Tet Offensive	Defense of Saigon from 31 January to 10 February 1968 including the attack on the US Embassy, battle of Cholon and Phu Tho Racetrack and the attack on the Joint General Staff Compound

=== Persian Gulf War ===
Unit	Service	Year awarded	Campaign or battle	Notes
Marine Aircraft Group 14 (MAG-14)	U.S. Marine Corps	1995	Operation Desert Storm	During Operation Desert Storm, MAG-14 flew night combat missions deep into Iraq and over Kuwait and provided artillery destruction of the Iraqi Republican Guard. This is MAG-14's second Presidential Unit Citation in its combat history, one of only two MAGs to achieve this honor.

=== Global War on Terrorism ===
Unit	Service	Period	Awarded	Campaign	Notes
Combined Joint Special Operations Task Force-SOUTH/Task Force K-BAR	Navy	Oct 2001 – Mar 2002	7 Dec 2004	Operation Enduring Freedom	Joint task force composed of U.S. Navy, Army and Air Force personnel, along with allied forces from Canada, Norway, Denmark, Germany, Australia, New Zealand and Turkey.
1st BCT, 1st Armored Division	Army	9 Mar 2004 – 27 Jun 2004	16 Aug 2011	Operation Iraqi Freedom	Permanent Order 228-05 (Archived)
2nd Battalion, 7th Cavalry	Army	3 Nov 2004 – 24 Nov 2004	10 Mar 2008	Operation Iraqi Freedom	Second Battle of Fallujah; Permanent Orders 070-18
5th Squadron, 73rd Cavalry Regiment.	Army	12 Nov 2006 – 14 Jan 2007	12 May 2010	Operation Iraqi Freedom	Deployment in Diyala Province, Iraq; Permanent Order 132-09
2d Battalion, 503d Infantry Regiment	Army	5 Jun 2007 – 10 Nov 2007	26 Oct 2011	Operation Enduring Freedom	Assigned as Task Force Rock in Kunar and Southern Nuristan Provinces, Afghanistan; Permanent Order 299–18
1d Battalion, 508th Infantry Regiment	Army	7 December 2007 to 12 December 2007	2 June 2023	Operation Enduring Freedom	By Order of the 45th President of the United States, award of the Presidential Unit Citation to the following units of the Armed Forces of the United States for extraordinary heroism in action against and armed enemy in accordance with Army Regulation 600–8–22, paragraph 7–2: GENERAL ORDERS NO. 2023 –12
Marine Expeditionary Brigade-Afghanistan (MEB-A)	Marine Corps	29 May 2009 – 12 Apr 2010	2012	Operation Enduring Freedom	Announced in MARADMIN 615/12
2nd Brigade Combat Team, 101st Airborne Division (Air Assault)	Army	2010–11	2013	Operation Enduring Freedom	The award was earned by the brigade's performance in the Taliban heartland of Kandahar Province, Afghanistan, during Operation Enduring Freedom 10–11 . The area was considered a "no-go" zone for coalition troops until 2nd BCT retook control in a determined campaign that was among the most difficult and bloody for the 101st Airborne in the post 9/11 era.
1st Battalion, 75th Ranger Regiment	Army	15 May 2010 – 20 Oct 2010	10 May 2012	Operation Enduring Freedom	Permanent Order 131–26

==== Iraq War ====
Unit	Service	Year awarded	Campaign or battle	Notes
5th Squadron, 73rd Cavalry Regiment, 82d Airborne Division	U.S. Army	2011	Operation Iraqi Freedom	For extraordinary heroism in action against an armed enemy. During the period 12 November 2006 to 14 January 2007, Headquarters and Headquarters Troop, 5th Squadron, 73d Cavalry Regiment and its subordinate units displayed extraordinary heroism in action against an armed enemy in and around Turki Village, Diyala Province, Iraq, while deployed in support of Operation Iraqi Freedom. During this period, the unit successfully built a capable and effective Iraqi Security Force which prevented enemy personnel and materiel from crossing through Iran into Iraq, denied safe haven to insurgents and provided a peaceful and secure environment for the Iraqi people. In addition, the unit conducted countless combat patrols and launched Operation Turki Bowl, an extremely successful offensive campaign which crushed the will of a Wahabist insurgent group known as "The Council. " The council had enacted a violent guerrilla campaign against the Iraqi Security Forces and local Iraqi civilian population, greatly threatening regional stability. However, the unit fearlessly met the threat head-on, conducting 14 squadron and troop-level operations over a 3-month period which set the stage for a classic linear battle in which over 250 Al Qaeda operatives were killed and over 100 caches discovered. The unit's outstanding accomplishments, indomitable spirit and peerless heroism directly contributed to Coalition Forces' success. Headquarters and Headquarters Troop, 5th Squadron, 73d Cavalry Regiment's outstanding performance of duty is in keeping with the finest traditions of military service and reflects great credit on the unit, the 82d Airborne Division, and the United States Army.
1st Infantry Division	U.S. Army	2004 to 2005	Operation Iraqi Freedom	Army Citation
1st Armored Division	U.S. Army	2004	Operation Iraqi Freedom	Army Citation
3d Infantry Division	U.S. Army	2003	Operation Iraqi Freedom	The 3rd Infantry Division and its supporting units distinguished themselves by extraordinary gallantry, valor, professionalism and esprit de corps displayed in the conduct of usually complex, difficult, and hazardous combat operation to liberate Iraq from 19 March 2003 to 1 May 2003. Relentlessly attacking over unforgiving terrain during extremely difficult weather conditions, the division advanced 750 kilometers while spearheading the Coalition's offensive. Also this also affects the division as well. Continuously opposed by determined Iraqi forces using both conventional and unconventional tactics, under frequent threat of chemical attack, the soldiers of the 3d Infantry Division decisively won every engagement of every battle by virtue of their unequaled fighting spirit, dedication to duty, and commitment to their cause. Before the fighting ended, the division defeated or destroyed four Republican Guard Divisions, one Iraqi Regular Army Division, three Special Republican Guard Brigades, and thousands of fanatical paramilitary forces; sustaining few casualties, the 3d Infantry Division achieved one of the most stunning victories in military history. Aggressively attacking into the heart of Baghdad the division ultimately removed the brutal Iraqi regime from power, then rapidly transitioned to enforce law and order and help rebuild a shattered nation despite the constant threat of terrorist attacks. Its efforts have been instrumental in the success of Operation Iraqi Freedom. The courage, skill, and professionalism of the division's soldiers and its supporting units exemplify the highest traditions of military service and are in keeping with the finest tradition of the 3d Infantry Division "Rock of the Marne" and the United States Army.
I Marine Expeditionary Force	U.S. Marine Corps	21Mar-24Apr2003	Operation Iraqi Freedom	For extraordinary heroism and outstanding performance in action against enemy forces in support of Operation Iraqi Freedom from 21 March to 24 April 2003. During this period, I Marine Expeditionary Force (MEF) (REIN) conducted the longest sequence of coordinated combined arms overland attacks in the history of the Marine Corps. From the border between Kuwait and Iraq, to the culmination of hostilities north of Baghdad, I MEF advanced nearly 800 kilometers under sustained and heavy combat. Using the devastating combat power of organic aviation assets, coupled with awesome power resident in the ground combat elements and maintaining momentum through the herculean efforts of combat service support elements, I MEF destroyed nine Iraqi divisions. This awesome display of combat power was accomplished while simultaneously freeing the Iraqi people from more than 30 years of oppression and reestablishing basic infrastructure in the country. During the 33 days of combat, to the transition to civil-military operations, I MEF sustained tempo of operations never before seen on the modern battlefield, conducting four major river crossings, maintaining the initiative, and sustaining forces. The ferocity and duration of the campaign was made possible through the skills and determination of the Soldiers, Sailors, Airmen, Marines, and Coalition Partners comprising I MEF at all levels, all echelons, and in all occupational fields. By their devotion to duty, the officers and enlisted personnel of I Marine Expeditionary Force (REIN) reflect great credit upon themselves and upheld the highest traditions of the Marine Corps and the United States Naval Service.
**1st Special Forces Operational Detachment-Delta**	U.S. Army	19Mar-13Dec2003	Operation Iraqi Freedom	Permanent Order 137–33 For extraordinary heroism in action against an armed enemy. During the period 19 March 2003 to 13 December 2003, the 1st Special Forces Operational Detachment-DELTA distinguished itself by extraordinary heroism, valor and gallantry, for its actions while engaged in sustained conflict with Iraqi Military Forces and Terrorist Insurgent Forces throughout the Iraqi Theater of Operations. Charged with the mission to interdict the lines of communication out of Iraq and to conduct direct action missions against Ba'ath Party Leadership, the unit conducted extensive special operations raids against the High Value Targets (HVT) within the Ba'ath Party Senior Leadership. This relentless and unprecedented series of special operation missions, conducted with surgical precision, decapitated Iraq's Senior Leadership and brought to justice a great majority of HVTs within the Ba'athist Regime. During this dynamic period of sustained, high-risk combat operations, the members of the unit earned 144 valor awards and were awarded 22 purple hearts. The 1st Special Forces Operational Detachment-DELTA's combat prowess, martial skills and steadfast devotion to duty are in keeping with the finest traditions of the Special Operations Forces and the United States Army.
First Naval Construction Division – 1st Marine Expeditionary Force I MEF – Engineer Group (I MEG)	U.S. Navy	2003	Operation Iraqi Freedom	Navy Citation, for 31 March to 24 April 2003
NSW Task Group-Central, NSW Squadron 3, and NSW Unit 3	U.S. Navy	2006	Operation Iraqi Freedom	Navy Citation
814th Bridge Company – Attached to 3d ID	U.S. Army	2003	Operation Iraqi Freedom	Army Citation
478th Combat Engineer Battalion – Attached to 1st MEF	U.S. Army	2003	Operation Iraqi Freedom	Army Confirmed Navy Citation
DETACHMENT, 9TH PSYCHOLOGICAL OPERATIONS BATTALION – Attached to 1st MEF	U.S. Army	2003	Operation Iraqi Freedom	Army Confirmed Navy Citation
354TH PUBLIC AFFAIRS DETACHMENT – Attached to 1st MEF	U.S. Army	2003	Operation Iraqi Freedom	Army Confirmed Navy Citation
H&H DETACHMENT, 468TH CHEMICAL BATTALION – Attached to 1st MEF	U.S. Army	2003	Operation Iraqi Freedom	Army Confirmed Navy Citation
U.S. ARMY SPACE SUPPORT TEAM – Attached to 1st MEF	U.S. Army	2003	Operation Iraqi Freedom	Army Confirmed Navy Citation
86TH SIGNAL BATTALION – Attached to 1st MEF	U.S. Army	2003	Operation Iraqi Freedom	Army Confirmed Navy Citation
208TH SIGNAL COMPANY – Attached to 1st MEF	U.S. Army	2003	Operation Iraqi Freedom	Army Confirmed Navy Citation
COMPANY C, 40TH SIGNAL BATTALION – Attached to 1st MEF	U.S. Army	2003	Operation Iraqi Freedom	Army Confirmed Navy Citation
3RD BATTALION, 27TH FIELD ARTILLERY – Attached to 1st MEF	U.S. Army	2003	Operation Iraqi Freedom	Army Confirmed Navy Citation
1ST FIELD ARTILLERY DETACHMENT – Attached to 1st MEF	U.S. Army	2003	Operation Iraqi Freedom	Army Confirmed Navy Citation
498TH MEDICAL COMPANY – Attached to 1st MEF	U.S. Army	2003	Operation Iraqi Freedom	Army Confirmed Navy Citation
H&H BATTERY, 108TH AIR DEFENSE ARTILLERY BRIGADE – Attached to 1st MEF	U.S. Army	2003	Operation Iraqi Freedom	Army Confirmed Navy Citation
2ND BATTALION, 43RD AIR DEFENSE ARTILLERY – Attached to 1st MEF	U.S. Army	2003	Operation Iraqi Freedom	Army Confirmed Navy Citation
3rd Battalion, 124th Infantry Regiment – Attached to 1st MEF and separately awarded attached to 3rd Infantry Division	U.S. Army	2003	Operation Iraqi Freedom	Army Citation (3ID); Army Confirmed Navy Citation (I MEF)
555TH MAINTENANCE COMPANY – Attached to 1st MEF	U.S. Army	2003	Operation Iraqi Freedom	Army Confirmed Navy Citation
HHC DETACHMENT, 378TH SUPPORT BATTALION – Attached to 1st MEF	U.S. Army	2003	Operation Iraqi Freedom	Army Confirmed Navy Citation
777TH MAINTENANCE COMPANY – Attached to 1st MEF	U.S. Army	2003	Operation Iraqi Freedom	Army Confirmed Navy Citation
727TH TRANSPORTATION COMPANY – Attached to 1st MEF	U.S. Army	2003	Operation Iraqi Freedom	Army Confirmed Navy Citation
319TH TRANSPORTATION COMPANY – Attached to 1st MEF	U.S. Army	2003	Operation Iraqi Freedom	Army Confirmed Navy Citation
319TH TRANSPORTATION DETACHMENT – Attached to 1st MEF	U.S. Army	2003	Operation Iraqi Freedom	Army Confirmed Navy Citation
299TH ENGINEER COMPANY – Attached to 1st MEF	U.S. Army	2003	Operation Iraqi Freedom	Army Confirmed Navy Citation
459TH ENGINEER COMPANY – Attached to 1st MEF	U.S. Army	2003	Operation Iraqi Freedom	Army Confirmed Navy Citation
HHC DETACHMENT, 716TH MILITARY POLICE BATTALION – Attached to 1st MEF	U.S. Army	2003	Operation Iraqi Freedom	Army Confirmed Navy Citation
HHC, 265TH ENGINEER GROUP – Attached to 1st MEF	U.S. Army	2003	Operation Iraqi Freedom	Army Confirmed Navy Citation
130TH ENGINEER BATTALION – Attached to 1st MEF	U.S. Army	2003	Operation Iraqi Freedom	Army Confirmed Navy Citation
478TH ENGINEER BATTALION – Attached to 1st MEF	U.S. Army	2003	Operation Iraqi Freedom	Army Confirmed Navy Citation
Company B, 51st Signal Battalion -Attached to 3d Infantry Division	U.S. Army	2003	Operation Iraqi Freedom	Army Citation
HHC, 358TH CIVIL AFFAIRS BRIGADE – Attached to 1st MEF	U.S. Army	2003	Operation Iraqi Freedom	Army Confirmed Navy Citation

=== Other actions ===
Unit	Service	Year awarded	Campaign or battle	Notes
United States Coast Guard	U.S. Coast Guard	2006	Hurricane Katrina	Entire Coast Guard (including Coast Guard Auxiliary and civilian employees)
Joint Special Operations Command	U.S. Navy; U.S. Army; U.S. Air Force	2011	Operation Neptune Spear	
USS Liberty (AGTR-5)	U.S. Navy	June 8–9, 1967	Six-Day War	Among the awards earned by the officers and enlisted crew of the USS Liberty due to surviving the 1967 USS Liberty incident are 1 Medal of Honor, 2 Navy Crosses, 12 Silver Stars, 20 Bronze Stars, 9 Navy Commendation Medals, 208 Purple Hearts, 294 Combat Action Ribbons, and the Presidential Unit Citation, which makes the USS Liberty one of the most decorated ships in U.S. Navy history and the most decorated for a single engagement. In 1991 (24 years after the attack), Rear Admiral Thomas A. Brooks presented approximately 50 Liberty survivors at the White House with the Citation that had been signed by President Lyndon B. Johnson but never awarded.
USS Jimmy Carter (SSN-23)	U.S. Navy	2012		
United States Public Health Service	U.S. Public Health Service	2015	Ebola virus disease	U.S. President Obama recognized the PHS Commissioned Corps for its work as a uniformed service working on the frontlines of the Ebola epidemic in West Africa
United States Public Health Service	U.S. Public Health Service	2021	COVID-19 pandemic	U.S. President Trump recognized the PHS Commissioned Corps for its work as a uniformed service working during the COVID-19 pandemic.
USS Washington (SSN-787)	U.S. Navy	2024		
USS Gerald R. Ford (CVN-78); Carrier Strike Group 12	U.S. Navy	2026		The Carrier Strike Group 12 had been awarded the Presidential Unit Citation by U.S. Secretary of Defense Pete Hegseth following the CSGs' actions during Operation Epic Fury.
USNS Kanawha (T-AO-196)	U.S. Navy	2026		First MSC ship to earn the Presidential Unit Citation.

== U.S. and Non-U.S. Unit recipients ==
For a full list of non-U.S. units receiving Distinguished Unit Citations and later the renamed Presidential Unit Citation see Non-U.S. recipients of U.S. gallantry awards#Unit citations

=== World War II ===
A reconnaissance and intelligence unit (1st Bn.) of the 394th Infantry Regiment, on the 16th December 1944 at Losheimergraben, found itself in a situation which turned into a decisive battle with an overwhelming German Paratrooper Bn. Almost 40 years later their heroic fight was awarded with the Presidential Unit Citation Order No. 26 in 1981. The memorial plaque is mounted on a stone at the N626 at the Losheimergraben crossroads.

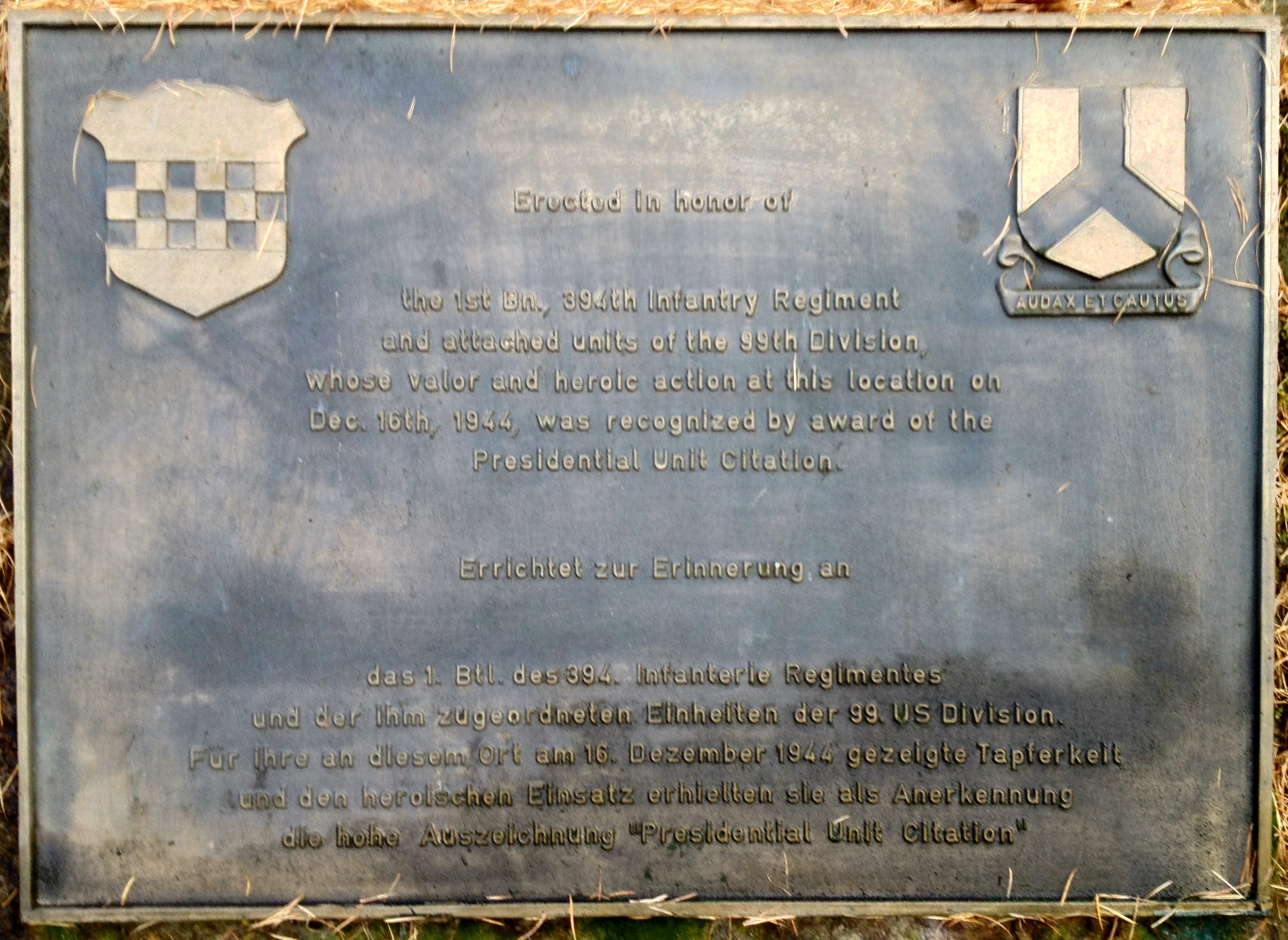
Memorial plaque for Presidential Unit Citation near Losheimergraben

Erected in honor of the 1st Bn., 394th Infantry Regiment and attached units of the 99th Division, whose valor and heroic action at this location on Dec. 16th, 1944, was recognized by award of the Presidential Unit Citation No. 26

Says Captain John Della-Giustina, "For their exploits, the I&R Platoon, 394th Infantry Regiment, 99th Infantry Division, would later become "the most heavily decorated platoon for a single action in World War II."

Two units of the Free French Forces were awarded Presidential Unit Citations during World War II. The first was the 2nd Armored Division, which received the award after the liberation of Strasbourg; the second was the 3rd Foreign Infantry Regiment, which received it in 1946 with the inscription 'Rhine-Bavarian Alps'.

On April 22, 1986, the 1st Fighter Aviation Group of the Força Aérea Brasileira (the Brazilian Air Force) was awarded the Presidential Unit Citation for its actions in the Po Valley region of Italy in World War II. The Brazilians, operating in Italy in support of Allied forces, destroyed in one day (April 22, 1945) over 45 vehicles, strafed pontoon bridges on the River Po (hampering a German retreat) and harassed fixed positions of the German forces. From the citation:

The casualties that they suffered reduced their pilot strength to about one half that of the United States Army Air Force squadrons operating in the same area, but they flew an equal number of sorties as their US counterparts ... Eleven missions of 44 sorties were flown destroying nine motor transports and damaging 17. Additionally, they destroyed the facilities of a motor pool, immobilized 35 horse vehicles, damaged a road bridge and a pontoon bridge, destroyed 14 and damaged three enemy-occupied buildings, and attacked four military positions and inflicted much other damage.

=== Korean War ===
The 1st Battalion, Gloucestershire Regiment and Troop C, 170th Independent Mortar Battery RA of the British Army were both awarded US Presidential Unit Citations for their defense of Hill 235 while surrounded by Chinese forces during the Battle of the Imjin River also known by the US as the Battle of Solmari. The 2nd Battalion, Princess Patricia's Canadian Light Infantry and 3rd Battalion, Royal Australian Regiment were awarded the citation for their actions during the Battle of Kapyong, shortly afterwards.

One Belgian-Luxembourgian battalion of the Belgian United Nations Command (now the 3rd Parachute Regiment,) was awarded the Presidential Unit Citation once for actions during the Battle of the Imjin River.

The Colombia Battalion received the citation while attached to the American 21st Infantry Regiment in 1951.

One Dutch unit, the Netherlands Detachment United Nations, part of the Regiment Van Heutsz, was awarded the Presidential Unit Citation twice for actions during the Korean War. The first citation was awarded after the battle near Wonju and Hoengson in February 1951. The unit was awarded a second time for its bravery during the Soyang River Battle in May–June 1951.

President Harry Truman signed a Distinguished Unit Citation (now the Presidential Unit Citation) on July 11, 1951, for the Turkish Brigade's acts of heroism. It reads: "The Turkish Brigade, a member of the United Nations Forces in Korea is cited for exceptionally outstanding performance of duty in combat in the area of Kumyangjang-ni, Korea, from 25 to 27 January 1951."

The Greek Expeditionary Force (Korea), Sparta Battalion, received its first US Presidential Unit Citation in February 1952 for the capture of Scotch Hill. It was awarded the Presidential Unit Citation for the second time for their actions in the defense of Outpost Harry while vastly outnumbered by Chinese forces, June 18, 1953. The 13th Flight of the Royal Hellenic Air Force received a US Presidential Unit Citation for its participation in the evacuation of US Marines at Hagaru-ri in December 1950.

The French battalion of the UN forces in Korea, attached to the 23rd Infantry Regiment, US 2nd Infantry Division ("Indian Head"), received 3 Distinguished Unit Citations in 1951 : on February 20, July 11 (actions in Chipyong-Ni) and August 9 (as part of the 2nd Infantry Division).

The 2 Squadron SAAF of South Africa was awarded the honor, which was presented in August 1956.

41 Commando Royal Marines was awarded the US Navy and Marine Corps PUC for its actions at the Chosin Reservoir while attached to the 1st Marine Division.

The 17th Bombardment Group was awarded the Republic of Korea Presidential Unit Citation for the period May 24, 1952 – March 31, 1953 and Distinguished Unit Citation for actions December 1, 1952 – April 30, 1953.

=== Vietnam War ===
President Lyndon B. Johnson awarded a Presidential Unit Citation to 1st Brigade 101st Airborne June 2–22 during Operation Hawthorne Dak To Province elements of 327th Tiger Force & Attached Recon of A troop 17th Cavalry also were awarded a Vietnam Presidential Unit Citation from South Vietnamese Prime Minister Nguyễn Cao Kỳ for extraordinary heroism; the 2nd 327 also received a second Presidential citation from President Johnson at the Battle of Tou Mourong in 1966.

A Presidential Unit Citation was awarded to D Company, 6th Battalion, Royal Australian Regiment, on 28 May 1968, for the units actions during the Battle of Long Tan on 18 August 1966.

In 1968 The Presidential Unit Citation was awarded to units of the 3rd Brigade of the 4th Infantry Division (2/12th Inf, 3/22nd Inf,2/22nd Mech Inf, 2/77th Artillery and Brigade Command unit at the battle site) for their participation in the Battle of Suoi Tre. In addition elements of the 2/34th Armor were also awarded the PUC for their participation in that battle. That battle would have the distinction of killing more of the enemy in a one-day battle of the entire war. 647 dead enemy soldiers were recovered from the battle site at the conclusion of the battle. See PUC General Orders 59, dated 21 October 1968

In 1968, the Presidential Unit Citation was awarded to the 3d Marine Division (Reinforced) "for extraordinary heroism and outstanding performance of duty" ... "from 8 March 1965 to 15 September 1967." See MCBul 1650 for included units list.

In 1969, the Presidential Unit Citation was awarded to USS Harnett County (LST-821) by President Richard Nixon, for Extraordinary Heroism during the period 12 December 1968 to 30 April 1969 supporting Operation Giant Slingshot on the Vam Co Dong River. <Award Citation>

In 2012, the Presidential Unit Citation was awarded to the 4th contingent, CDT3 [Clearance Diving Team 3], Royal Australian Navy for service during the Vietnam War in 1968/69.

In 1977, the Presidential Unit Citation was presented to New Zealand's 161 Battery in 1977 for service during the Vietnam War in 1965–66.

In 1971, the Presidential Unit Citation was awarded to the 3d Armored Cavalry Squadron, Army of the Republic of Vietnam and attached U.S. Advisor/Liaison Personnel for extraordinary heroism during the period 1 January 1968 to 30 September 1968 in actions in Pleiku and Binh Dinh Provinces. (DA General Order No. 24, 27 April 1971.)

In 2001, the Presidential Unit Citation was awarded to the Republic of Vietnam Air Force 219th Helicopter Squadron (South Vietnam), Danang, Republic of Vietnam while assigned or attached to MACV-SOG for extraordinary heroism, great combat achievement and unwavering fidelity while executing unheralded top secret missions deep behind enemy lines across Southeast Asia during the period 24 January 1964 to 30 April 1972. (DA General Order No. 25, 8 June 2001.)

On October 20, 2009, President Barack Obama presented surviving members of Alpha Troop, 1st Squadron, 11th Armored Cavalry with the Presidential Unit Citation in the White House Rose Garden.

In 1966, the Presidential Unit Citation was awarded to the 514th Tactical Fighter Squadron of the Republic of Vietnam Air Force for extraordinary heroism and outstanding performance of duty in combat against an armed enemy of the Republic of Vietnam throughout the period 1 January 1964 to 28 February 1965.

In 1968 and 1970 the Air Force's 56 Special Operations Wing (56 SOW) was awarded two Presidential Unit Citations for extraordinary heroism and outstanding performance of duty while conducting Search and Rescue (SAR) operations in North Vietnam and Laos as well as strike, interdiction and Forward Air Control (FAC) operations against hostile forces.

Units of the Army, 3rd battalion, 16th Artillery were awarded the presidential unit citation for actions during the January, 1968 Tet offensive in Vietnam. They provided sustained artillery fire under severe conditions that protected their own troops and prevented the attacking forces of North Vietnam and the Viet Cong from retreating. The support they provided lasted for 72 hours, during which time the troops had no sleep and no time to eat. Some units of the 16th artillery received sniper and mortar fire but continued supporting troops in spite of the risks involved.

In 1973 the PUC was awarded to Carrier Air Wing Nine and USS Constellation for extrarodinary heroism. On May 10, 1972, VF-92 and VF-96 shot down 7 Migs tying the single day record of any air unit. Wing pilots received 5 Navy Crosses, and 24 Silver Stars.

=== Operation Enduring Freedom ===
On December 7, 2004, the Combined Joint Special Operations Task Force-South, known as Task Force K-Bar, a special collection of U.S. and international special forces units, was awarded the Presidential Unit Citation. This award, for service between 17 October 2001 and 30 March 2002, was very unusual in that it was made to multiple international units fighting in the War in Afghanistan.

The following units were recognized:

- Australian Special Air Service Regiment (although not a part of Task Force K-Bar)
- Canada's Joint Task Force 2
- New Zealand Special Air Service
- Denmark's Specialoperationsstyrke and Jægerkorpset
- Norway's Forsvarets Spesialkommando, Hærens Jegerkommando and Marinejegerkommandoen
- Germany's Kommando Spezialkräfte
- American units, including the

- U.S. Navy SEALs
- Special Warfare Combatant-craft Crewmen
- U.S. Army Special Forces
- Air Force Special Operations Command

In the Presidential Unit Citation for Task Force K-BAR, Major General W. Semianiw, Chief Military Personnel For the Chief of the Defense Staff, stated:

Operating first from Oman and then from forward locations throughout the southern and eastern regions of Afghanistan, successfully executed its primary mission to conduct special operations in support of the United States' efforts to destroy, degrade, and neutralize the Taliban and Al-Qaeda leadership and military. During its six-month existence, this Task Force was the driving force behind extremely high-risk missions and unconventional warfare operations in Afghanistan. The sailors, soldiers, airmen, marines and coalition partners of CJSOTF-South established benchmark standards of professionalism, tenacity, courage, tactical brilliance, and operational excellence while demonstrating superb esprit de corps and maintaining the highest measures of combat readiness. By their outstanding courage, resourcefulness and aggressive fighting spirit in combat against a well-equipped, well-trained, and treacherous terrorist enemy, the officers and enlisted personnel of CJSOTF-South/Task-Force K-BAR reflected great credit upon themselves and upheld the highest traditions of the United States Armed Forces.

In 2012, the Navy and Marine Corps Presidential Unit Citation was awarded and presented at the U.S. Embassy in Canberra to two members of the Australian Army for service as embedded members of the Marine Expeditionary Brigade-Afghanistan for outstanding performance in action against enemy forces from 29 May 2009 to 12 April 2010, in support of Operation Enduring Freedom.
