= Kamikaze =

1944–1945 Japanese suicidal aircraft attacks

A kamikaze attack aircraft crashes into a US naval warship, May 1945.

Kamikaze (神風; pronounced [kamiꜜkaze]; 'divine wind' or 'spirit wind'), officially Shinpū Tokubetsu Kōgekitai (神風特別攻撃隊; 'Divine Wind Special Attack Unit'), were a part of the Japanese Special Attack Units of military aviators who flew suicide attacks for the Empire of Japan against Allied naval vessels in the closing stages of the Pacific campaign of World War II, intending to destroy warships more effectively than with conventional air attacks. About 3,800 kamikaze pilots died during the war in attacks that killed more than 7,000 Allied naval personnel, sank several dozen warships, and damaged scores more. The term is used generically in modern warfare for an attacking vehicle which is itself destroyed when attacking a target; for example, a kamikaze drone.

Kamikaze aircraft are considered to be the "precursor of the modern cruise missile" by the United States Navy, and were either purpose-built or converted from conventional aircraft. Pilots would attempt to crash their aircraft into enemy ships in what was called a "body attack" (tai-atari) in aircraft loaded with bombs, torpedoes or other explosives. About 19 percent of kamikaze attacks were successful. The Japanese considered the goal of damaging or sinking large numbers of Allied ships to be a just reason for suicide attacks. By late 1944, Allied qualitative and quantitative superiority over the Japanese in both aircrew and aircraft meant that kamikaze attacks were more accurate than conventional airstrikes, and often caused more damage. Some kamikazes hit their targets even after their aircraft had been crippled.

The attacks began in October 1944, at a time when the war was looking increasingly bleak for the Japanese. They had lost several decisive battles; many of their best pilots had been killed, and skilled replacements could not be trained fast enough; their aircraft were becoming outdated; and they had lost command of the air and sea. These factors, along with Japan's unwillingness to surrender, led to the institutionalization of kamikaze tactics as a core aspect of Japanese air warfare strategy as Allied forces advanced towards the home islands.

A tradition of death instead of defeat, capture, and shame was deeply entrenched in Japanese military culture; one of the primary values in the samurai way of life and the Bushido code was loyalty and honor until death. In addition to kamikazes, the Japanese military also used or made plans for non-aerial Japanese Special Attack Units, including those involving Kairyu (submarines), Kaiten (human torpedoes), Shinyo speedboats, Smertnik infantrymen, and Fukuryu divers.

== Definition and origin ==
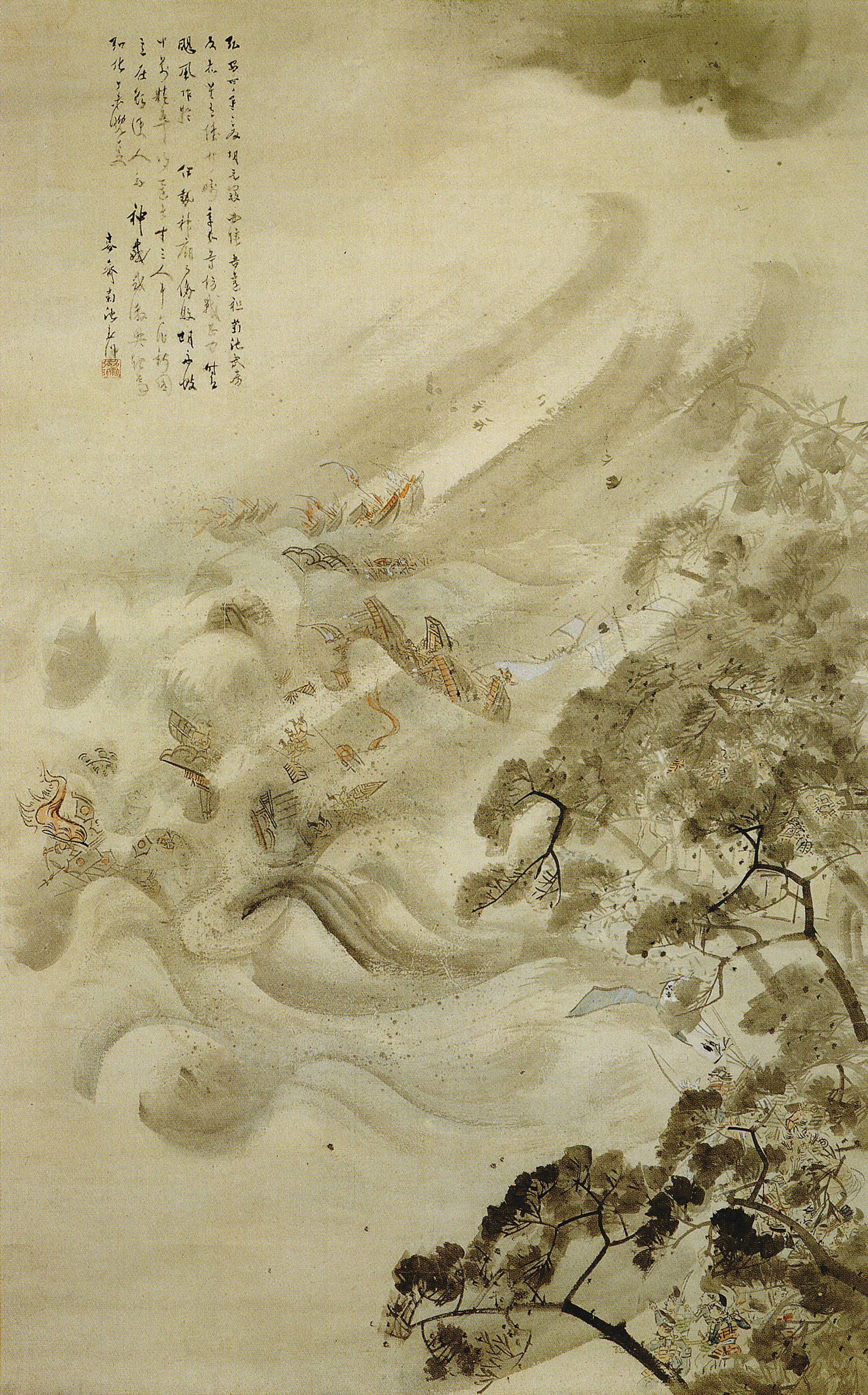
Kamikaze was a reference to the two typhoons that sank or dispersed Kublai Khan's invading Mongol fleets.

The Japanese word kamikaze is usually translated as "divine wind" (kami is the word for "god", "spirit", or "divinity", and kaze for "wind"). The word originated from Makurakotoba of waka poetry modifying "Ise" and has been used since August 1281 to refer to the major typhoons that dispersed Mongol-Koryo fleets which invaded Japan under Kublai Khan in 1274 and 1281.

A Japanese monoplane that made a record-breaking flight from Tokyo to London in 1937 for the Asahi newspaper group was named Kamikaze. She was a prototype for the Mitsubishi Ki-15 ("Babs").

In Japanese, the formal term used for units carrying out suicide attacks during 1944–1945 is tokubetsu kōgekitai (特別攻撃隊), which literally means "special attack unit". This is usually abbreviated to tokkōtai (特攻隊). More specifically, air suicide attack units from the Imperial Japanese Navy were officially called shinpū tokubetsu kōgeki tai (神風特別攻撃隊, "divine wind special attack units"). Shinpū is the on-reading (on'yomi or Chinese-derived pronunciation) of the same characters as the kun-reading (kun'yomi or Japanese pronunciation) kamikaze in Japanese. During World War II, the pronunciation kamikaze was used only informally in the Japanese press in relation to suicide attacks, but after the war, this usage gained acceptance worldwide and was re-imported into Japan.

== History ==
=== Background ===
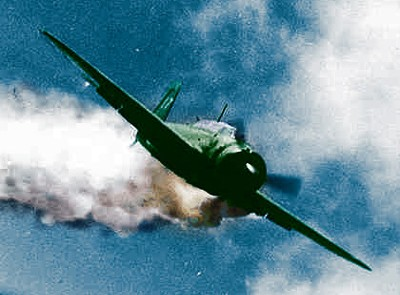
Lt. Yoshinori Yamaguchi's Yokosuka D4Y3 (Type 33 Suisei) "Judy" in a suicide dive against USS Essex on 25 November 1944. The attack left 15 killed and 44 wounded. The dive brakes are extended and the non-self-sealing port wing tank trails a mist of fuel, smoke and hydraulic fluid.

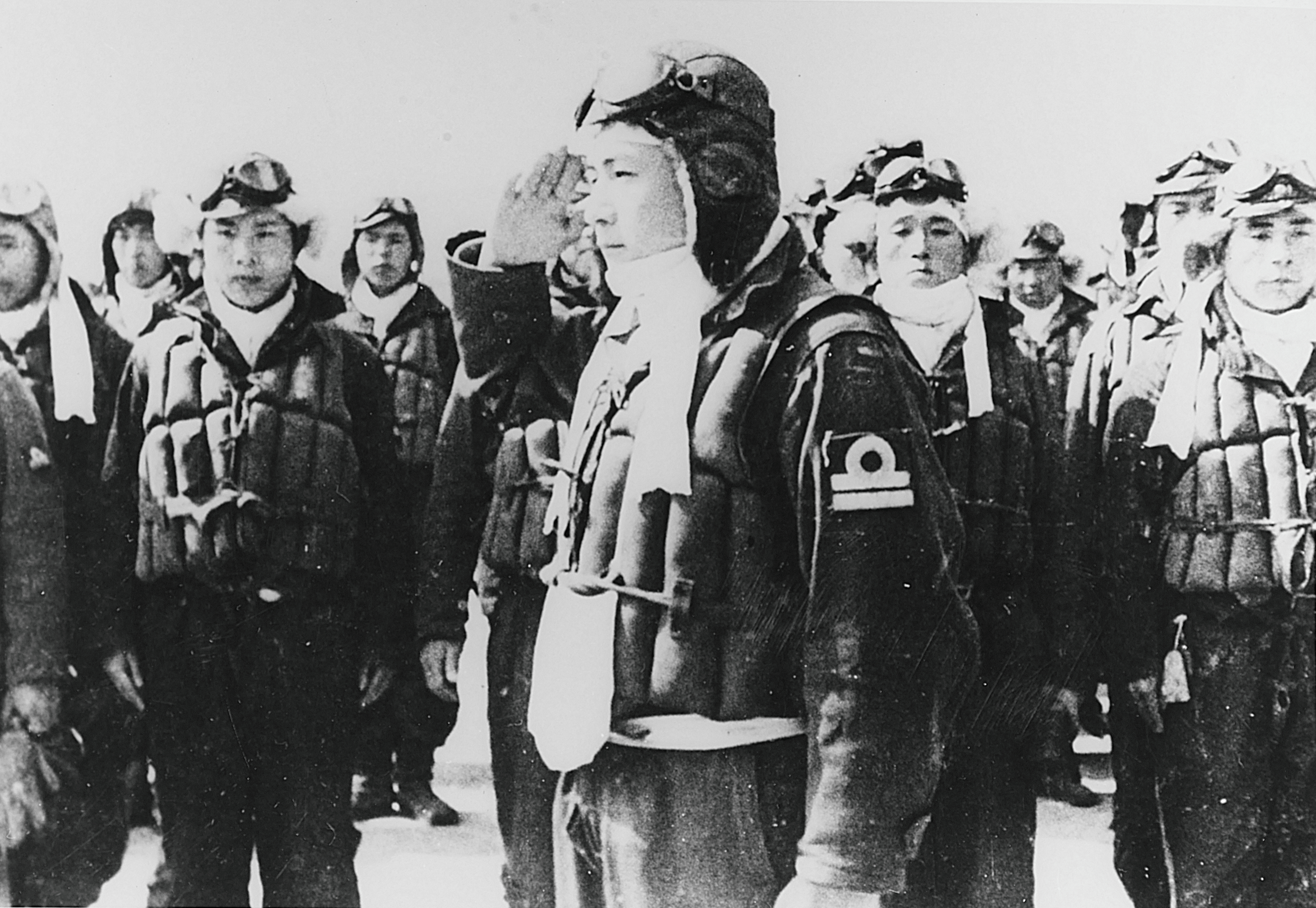
Navy Kamikaze pilot in the rank of a Lieutenant receives sortie orders. Over 90% of the Navy's Kamikaze pilots were between 18 and 24 years of age.

Before the official formation of kamikaze units, pilots had made deliberate crashes as a last resort when their aircraft had suffered severe damage and they did not want to risk being captured or wanted to do as much damage to the enemy as possible, since they were crashing anyway. Such situations occurred in both the Axis and Allied air forces. Axell and Kase see these suicides as "individual, impromptu decisions by men who were mentally prepared to die".

One example of this may have occurred on 7 December 1941 during the attack on Pearl Harbor. First Lieutenant Fusata Iida's aircraft had taken a hit and had started leaking fuel when he apparently used it to make a suicide attack on Naval Air Station Kaneohe. Before taking off, he had told his men that if his aircraft was badly damaged he would crash it into a "worthy enemy target". In late February 1942, Imperial Japanese Headquarters mentioned, for the first time, that a "human bomb" or Taiatari, had destroyed a US aircraft carrier. It was explained that the term, which meant "thrust of body," was the practice of Japanese airmen to dive with the full load of bombs on to their target. Another possible example occurred at the Battle of Midway when a damaged American bomber flew at the Akagi's bridge but missed. During the Naval Battle of Guadalcanal the US flagship, San Francisco, was heavily damaged during a Japanese bombing raid when a large twin-engined Japanese Mitsubishi G4M "Betty" medium bomber, which was in flames from anti-aircraft fire, most likely intentionally crashed into her backup conning tower, destroying almost all of the backup command equipment for the flagship. Most of the officers and men stationed there, including the executive officer, were killed or wounded. This de facto kamikaze strike greatly changed the course of what was to happen during the infamous "Friday the 13th" battle 12 hours later.

The carrier battles in 1942, particularly the Battle of Midway, inflicted irreparable damage on the Imperial Japanese Navy Air Service (IJNAS), such that it could no longer field a large number of fleet carriers with well-trained aircrews. Japanese planners had based their assumptions on a quick war and lacked comprehensive programs to replace mounting losses to ships, pilots, and sailors. Prior to the war, Japanese carrier pilots were carefully selected after undergoing years of training in specialized schools, which produced high-quality aircrew but at low volume; the Japanese military never meaningfully expanded or restructured this training pipeline. The Battle of Midway, the Solomon Islands campaign (1942–1945) and the New Guinea campaign (1942–1945) – notably the naval battles of the Eastern Solomons (August 1942) and Santa Cruz Islands (October 1942) – decimated the IJNAS veteran aircrews, and replacing their combat experience proved impossible.

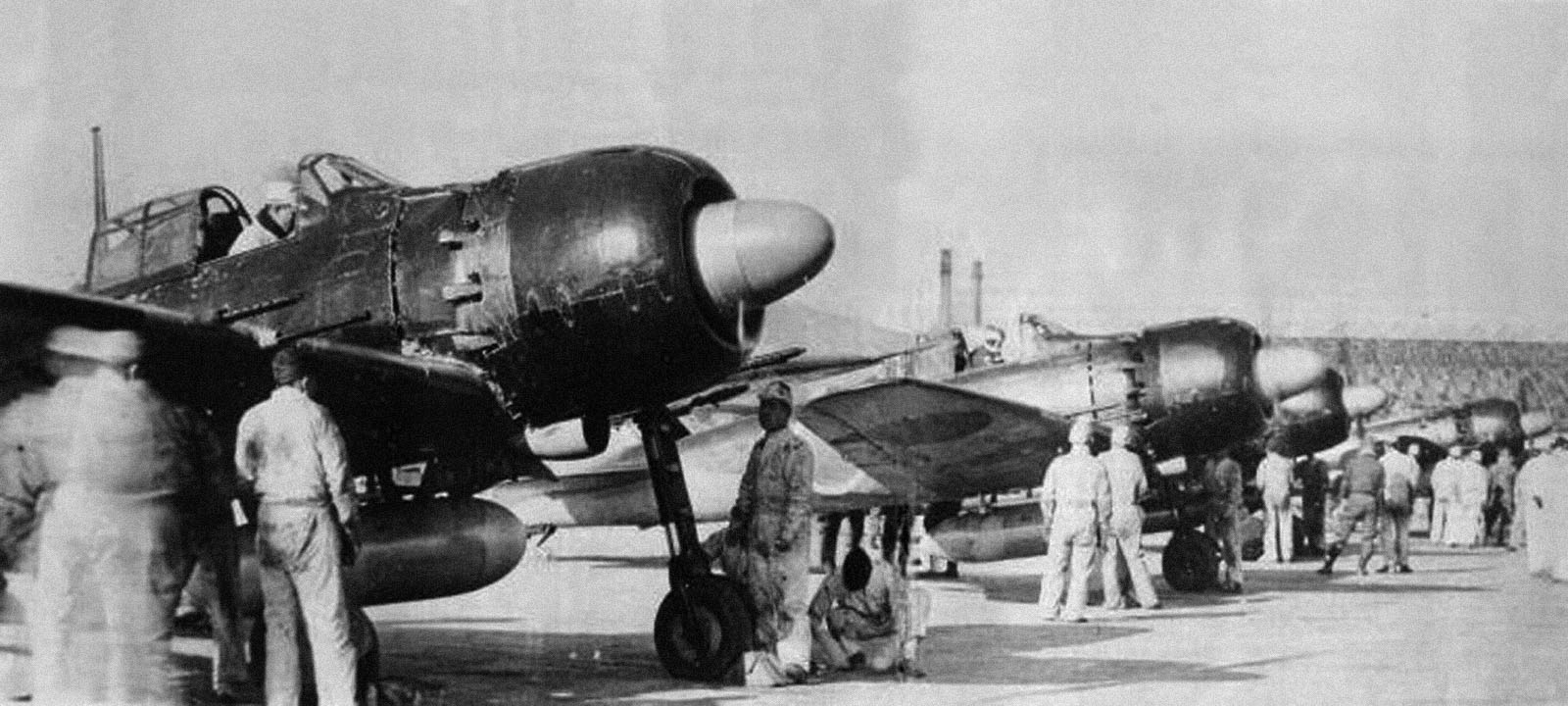
Model 52c Zeros ready to take part in a kamikaze attack (early 1945)

During 1943–1944, US forces steadily advanced toward Japan. Newer US-made aircraft, especially the Grumman F6F Hellcat and Vought F4U Corsair, outclassed and soon outnumbered Japan's fighters. Tropical diseases, as well as shortages of spare parts and fuel, made operations more and more difficult for the IJNAS. By the Battle of the Philippine Sea (June 1944), the Japanese had to make do with obsolete aircraft and inexperienced aviators in the fight against better-trained and more experienced US Navy airmen who flew radar-directed combat air patrols. The Japanese lost over 400 carrier-based aircraft and pilots in the Battle of the Philippine Sea, effectively destroying the IJN's carrier air arm. Allied aviators called the action the "Great Marianas Turkey Shoot".

On 19 June 1944, aircraft from the carrier Chiyoda approached a US task group. According to some accounts, two made suicide attacks, one of which hit USS Indiana.

The important Japanese base of Saipan fell to the Allied forces on 15 July 1944. Its capture provided adequate forward bases that enabled US air forces using the Boeing B-29 Superfortress to strike at the Japanese home islands. After the fall of Saipan, the Japanese High Command predicted that the Allies would try to capture the Philippines, strategically important to Tokyo because of the islands' location between the oilfields of Southeast Asia and Japan.

=== Beginnings ===
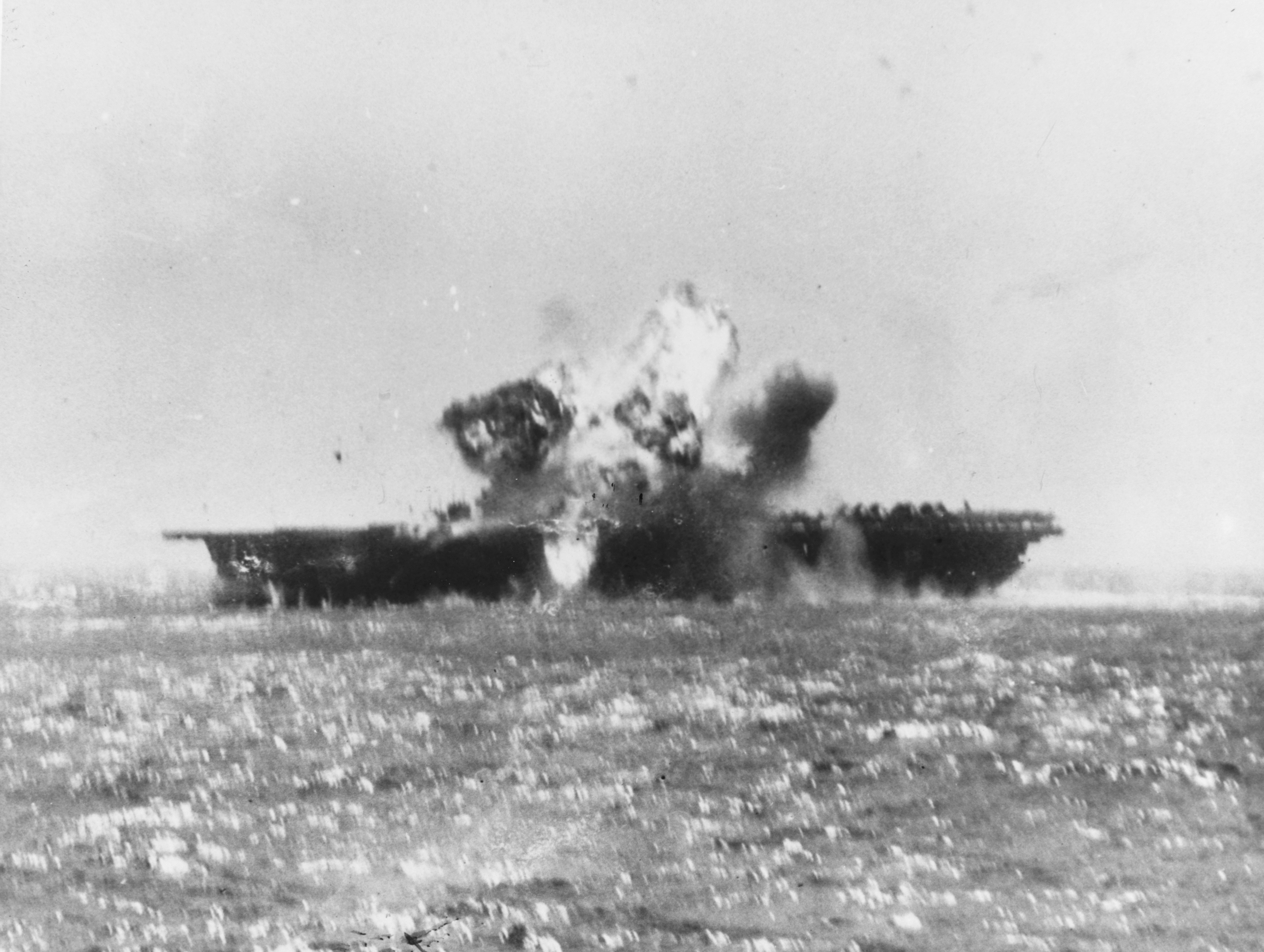
A kamikaze aircraft explodes after crashing into Essex's flight deck amidships 25 November 1944.

Captain Motoharu Okamura, in charge of the Tateyama Base in Tokyo, as well as the 341st Air Group Home, was, according to some sources, the first officer to officially propose kamikaze attack tactics. With his superiors, he arranged the first investigations into the plausibility and mechanisms of intentional suicide attacks on 15 June 1944. In August 1944, it was announced by the Domei news agency that a flight instructor named Takeo Tagata was training pilots in Taiwan for suicide missions.

One source claims that the first kamikaze mission occurred on 13 September 1944. A group of pilots from the army's 31st Fighter Squadron on Negros Island decided to launch a suicide attack the following morning. First Lieutenant Takeshi Kosai and a sergeant were selected. Two 100 kg (220 lb) bombs were attached to two fighters, and the pilots took off before dawn, planning to crash into carriers. They never returned, but there is no record of a kamikaze hitting an Allied ship that day. According to some sources, on 14 October 1944, USS Reno was hit by a deliberately crashed Japanese aircraft.

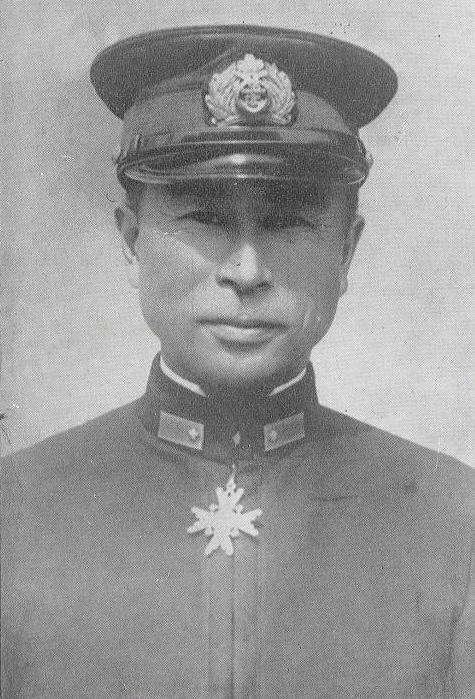
Rear Admiral Masafumi Arima

Rear Admiral Masafumi Arima, the commander of the 26th Air Flotilla (part of the 11th Air Fleet), is sometimes credited with inventing the kamikaze tactic. Arima personally led an attack by a Mitsubishi G4M "Betty" twin-engined bomber against a large Essex-class aircraft carrier, USS Franklin, near Leyte Gulf, on or about 15 October 1944. Arima was killed and part of an aircraft hit Franklin. The Japanese high command and propagandas seized on Arima's example. He was promoted posthumously to vice admiral and was given official credit for making the first kamikaze attack.

On 17 October 1944, Allied forces assaulted Suluan Island, beginning the Battle of Leyte Gulf. The Imperial Japanese Navy's 1st Air Fleet, based at Manila, was assigned the task of assisting the Japanese ships that would attempt to destroy Allied forces in Leyte Gulf. That unit had only 41 aircraft: 34 Mitsubishi A6M Zero ("Zeke") carrier-based fighters, three Nakajima B6N Tenzan ("Jill") torpedo bombers, one Mitsubishi G4M ("Betty") and two Yokosuka P1Y Ginga ("Frances") land-based bombers, and one reconnaissance aircraft. The task facing the Japanese air forces seemed impossible. The 1st Air Fleet commandant, Vice Admiral Takijirō Ōnishi, decided to form a suicide offensive force, the Special Attack Unit. In a meeting on 19 October at Mabalacat Airfield (known to the US military as Clark Air Base) near Manila, Onishi told officers of the 201st Flying Group headquarters: "I don't think there would be any other certain way to carry out the operation [to hold the Philippines] than to put a 250 kg bomb on a Zero and let it crash into a US carrier, in order to disable her for a week."

=== First unit ===
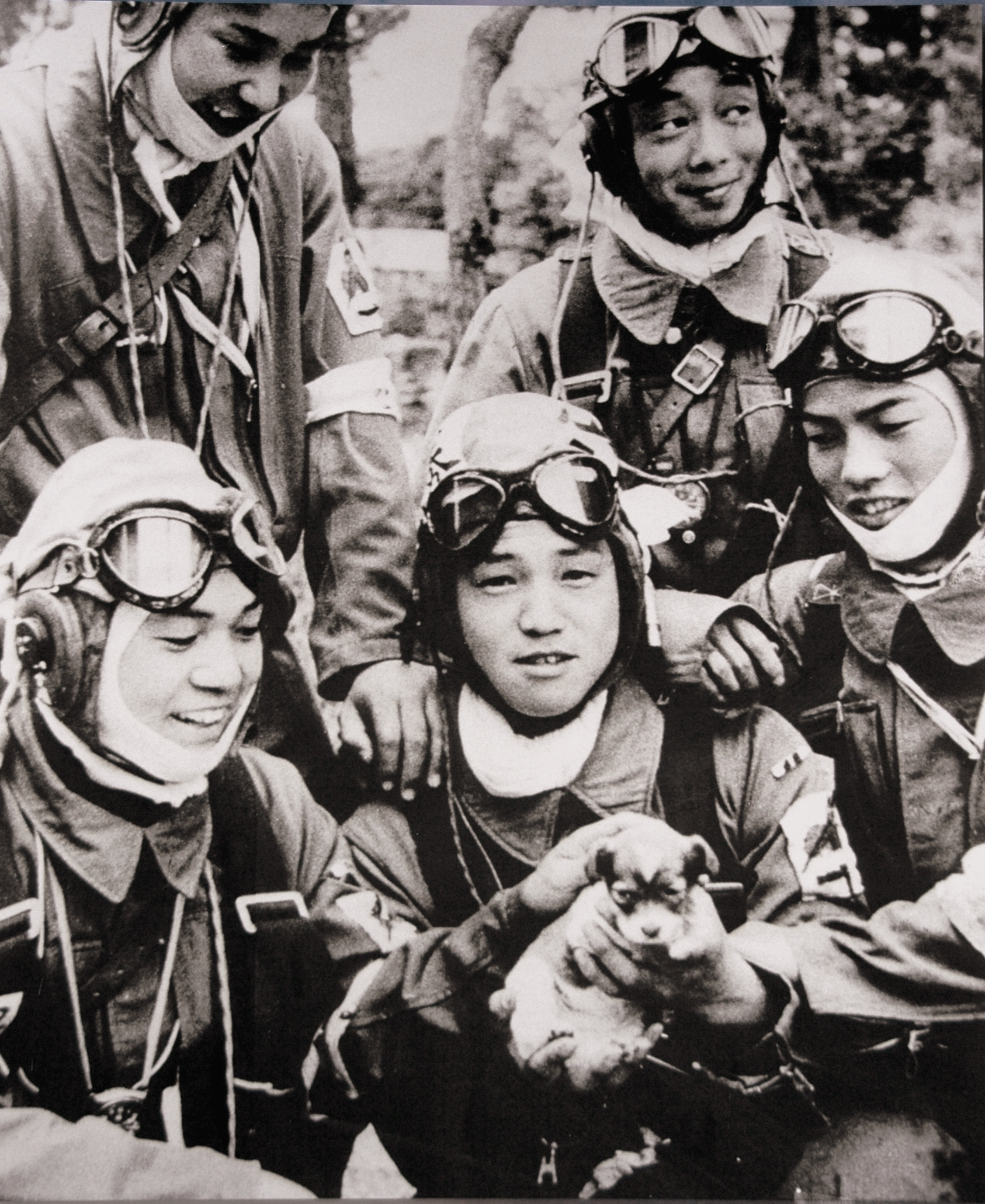
26 May 1945. Corporal Yukio Araki, holding a puppy, with four other pilots of the 72nd Shinbu Squadron at Bansei, Kagoshima. Araki died the following day, at the age of 17, in a suicide attack on ships near Okinawa.

Commander Asaichi Tamai asked a group of 23 talented student pilots, all of whom he had trained, to volunteer for the special attack force. All of the pilots raised both of their hands, volunteering to join the operation. Later, Tamai asked Lieutenant Yukio Seki to command the special attack force. Seki is said to have closed his eyes, lowered his head, and thought for ten seconds before saying: "Please do appoint me to the post." Seki became the 24th kamikaze pilot to be chosen. He later said: "Japan's future is bleak if it is forced to kill one of its best pilots" and "I am not going on this mission for the Emperor or for the Empire ... I am going because I was ordered to."

The names of the four subunits within the Kamikaze Special Attack Force were Unit Shikishima, Unit Yamato, Unit Asahi and Unit Yamazakura. These names were taken from a patriotic death poem by the Japanese classical scholar, Motoori Norinaga. The poem reads:

敷島の 大和心を 人問はば 朝日に匂う 山桜花

Shikishima no Yamato-gokoro wo hito towaba, asahi ni niou yamazakurabana

If someone asks about the Yamato spirit [Spirit of Old/True Japan] of Shikishima [a poetic name for Japan] – it is the flowers of yamazakura [mountain cherry blossom] that are fragrant in the Asahi [rising sun].

A less literal translation is:

Asked about the soul of Japan,
I would say
That it is
Like wild cherry blossoms
Glowing in the morning sun.

Ōnishi, addressing this unit, told them that their nobility of spirit would keep the homeland from ruin even in defeat.

=== Leyte Gulf: the first attacks ===
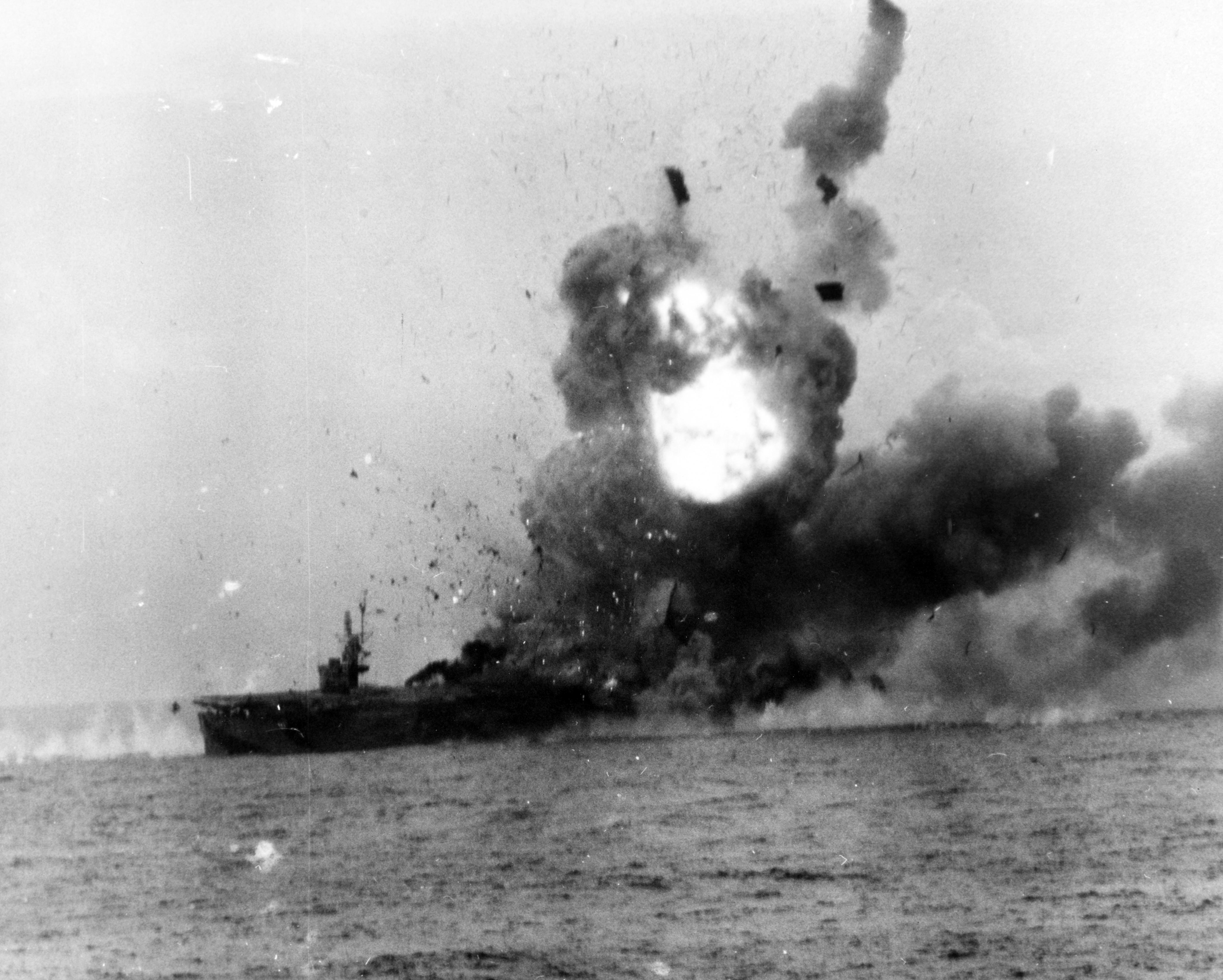
USS St. Lo attacked by kamikazes, 25 October 1944

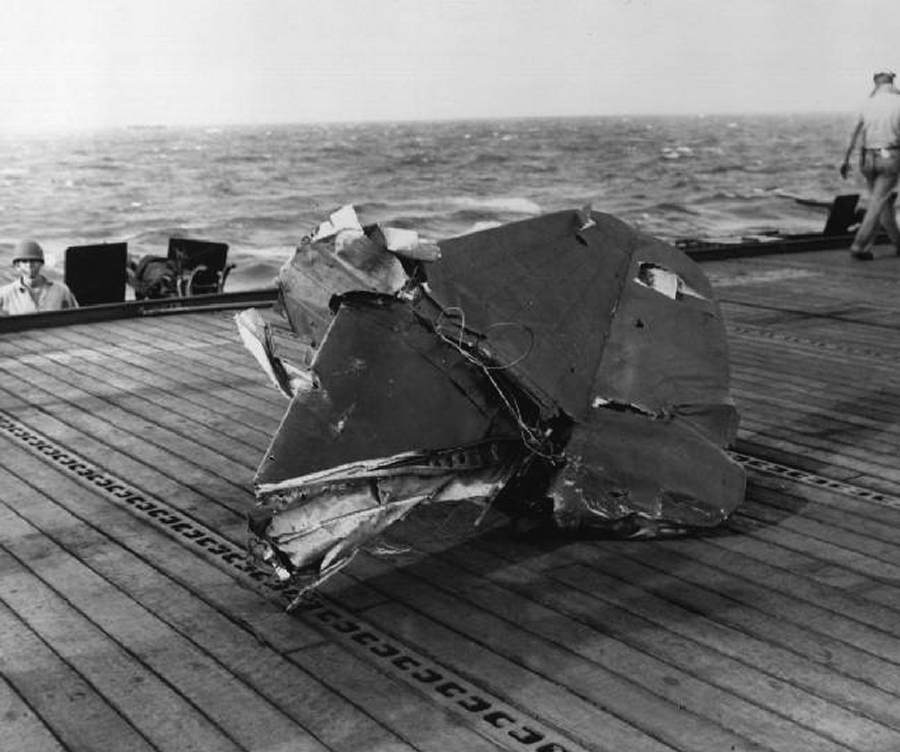
Right horizontal stabilizer from the tail of a "Judy" on the deck of USS Kitkun Bay. The "Judy" made a run on the ship approaching from dead astern; it was met by effective fire and the aircraft passed over the island and exploded. Parts of the aircraft and the pilot were scattered over the flight deck and the forecastle.

Several suicide attacks, carried out during the invasion of Leyte by Japanese pilots from units other than the Special Attack Force, have been described as the first kamikaze attacks. Early on 21 October 1944, a Japanese aircraft deliberately crashed into the foremast of the heavy cruiser HMAS Australia. This aircraft was possibly either an Aichi D3A dive bomber, from an unidentified unit of the Imperial Japanese Navy Air Service, or a Mitsubishi Ki-51 of the 6th Flying Brigade, Imperial Japanese Army Air Force. The attack killed 30 personnel, including the cruiser's captain, Emile Dechaineux, and wounded 64, including the Australian force commander, Commodore John Collins. The Australian official history of the war claimed that this was the first kamikaze attack on an Allied ship. Other sources disagree because it was not a planned attack by a member of the Special Attack Force and was most likely undertaken on the pilot's own initiative.

The sinking of the ocean tug USS Sonoma on 24 October is listed in some sources as the first ship lost to a kamikaze strike, but the attack occurred before the first mission of the Special Attack Force (on 25 October) and the aircraft used, a Mitsubishi G4M, was not flown by the original four Special Attack Squadrons.

On 25 October 1944, during the Battle of Leyte Gulf, the Kamikaze Special Attack Force carried out its first mission. Five A6M Zeros, led by Lieutenant Seki, were escorted to the target by leading Japanese ace Hiroyoshi Nishizawa where they attacked several escort carriers. One Zero attempted to hit the bridge of USS Kitkun Bay but instead exploded on the port catwalk and cartwheeled into the sea. Two others dived at USS Fanshaw Bay but were destroyed by anti-aircraft fire. The last two, Seki among them, ran at USS White Plains. Seki however, under heavy fire and trailing smoke, aborted the attack on White Plains and instead banked toward USS St. Lo, diving into the flight deck, where his bomb caused fires that resulted in the bomb magazine exploding, sinking the carrier.

By 26 October day's end, 55 kamikazes from the Special Attack Force had also damaged three large escort carriers: USS Sangamon, Santee, and Suwannee (which had taken a kamikaze strike forward of its aft elevator the day before); and three smaller escorts: USS White Plains, Kalinin Bay, and Kitkun Bay. In total, seven carriers were hit, as well as 40 other ships (5 sunk, 23 heavily damaged and 12 moderately damaged).

=== Main wave of attacks ===
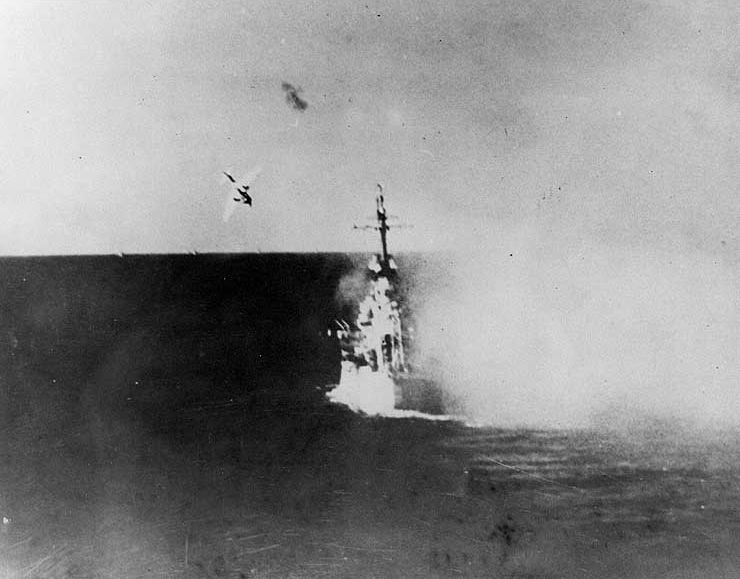
USS Columbia is attacked by a Mitsubishi Ki-51 kamikaze off Lingayen Gulf, 6 January 1945.

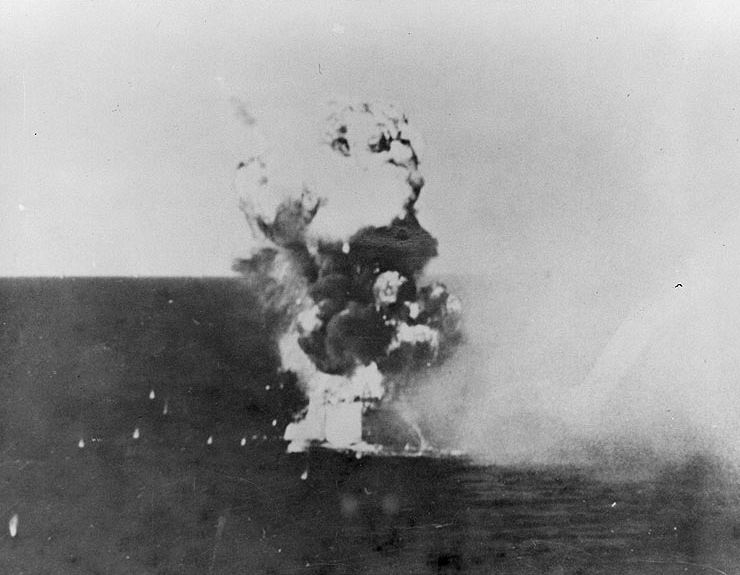
The kamikaze hits Columbia at 17:29. The aircraft and its bomb penetrated two decks before exploding, killing 13 and wounding 44.

Early successes—such as the sinking of USS St. Lo—were followed by an immediate expansion of the program, and over the next few months over 2,000 aircraft made such attacks.

When Japan began to suffer intense strategic bombing by Boeing B-29 Superfortresses, the Japanese military attempted to use suicide attacks against this threat. During the northern hemisphere winter of 1944–45, the IJAAF formed the 47th Air Regiment, also known as the Shinten Special Unit (Shinten Seiku Tai) at Narimasu Airfield, Nerima, Tokyo, to defend the Tokyo Metropolitan Area. The unit was equipped with Nakajima Ki-44 Shoki ("Tojo") fighters, whose pilots were instructed to collide with United States Army Air Forces (USAAF) B-29s approaching Japan. Targeting the aircraft proved to be much less successful and practical than attacks against warships, as the bombers made for much faster, more maneuverable, and smaller targets. The B-29 also had formidable defensive weaponry, so suicide attacks against B-29s demanded considerable piloting skill to be successful, which worked against the very purpose of using expendable pilots. Even encouraging capable pilots to bail out before impact was ineffective because vital personnel were often lost when they mistimed their exits and were killed as a result.

On 11 March, the US carrier USS Randolph was hit and moderately damaged at Ulithi Atoll, in the Caroline Islands, by a kamikaze that had flown almost 4,000 km (2,500 mi) from Japan, in a mission called Operation Tan No. 2. On 20 March, the submarine USS Devilfish survived a hit from an aircraft just off Japan.

Purpose-built kamikazes, opposed to converted fighters and dive-bombers, were also being constructed. Ensign Mitsuo Ohta had suggested that piloted glider bombs, carried within range of targets by a mother aircraft, should be developed. The First Naval Air Technical Bureau (Kugisho) in Yokosuka refined Ohta's idea. Yokosuka MXY-7 Ohka rocket-powered aircraft, launched from bombers, were first deployed in kamikaze attacks from March 1945. US personnel gave them the derisive nickname "Baka Bombs" (baka is Japanese for "idiot" or "stupid"). The Nakajima Ki-115 Tsurugi was a simple, easily built propeller aircraft with a wooden airframe that used engines from existing stocks. Its non-retractable landing gear was jettisoned shortly after takeoff for a suicide mission, recovered, and reused. Obsolete aircraft such as Yokosuka K5Y biplane trainers were also converted to kamikazes. During 1945, the Japanese military began stockpiling Tsurugi, Yokosuka MXY-7 Ohka, other aircraft and suicide boats for use against Allied forces expected to invade Japan. The invasion never happened, and few were ever used.

=== Allied defensive tactics ===
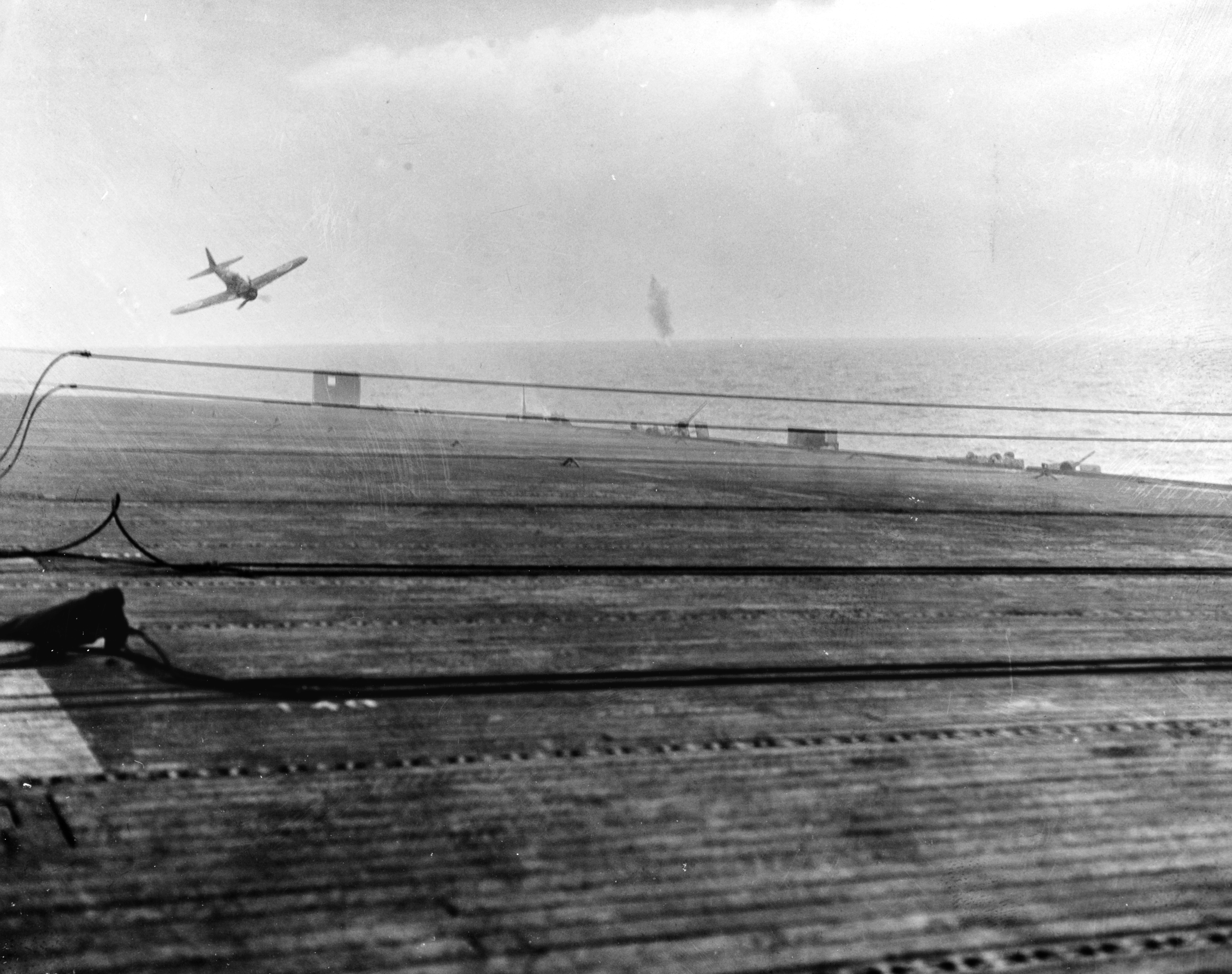
An A6M Zero (A6M2 Model 21) towards the end of its run at the escort carrier USS White Plains on 25 October 1944. The aircraft exploded in mid-air moments after the picture was taken, scattering debris across the deck.

In early 1945, US Navy aviator Commander John Thach, already famous for developing effective aerial tactics against the Japanese such as the Thach Weave, developed a defensive strategy against kamikazes called the "big blue blanket" to establish Allied air supremacy well away from the carrier force. This recommended combat air patrols (CAP) that were larger and operated farther from the carriers than before, a line of picket destroyers and destroyer escorts at least 80 km (50 mi) from the main body of the fleet to provide earlier radar interception and improved coordination between fighter direction officers on carriers. This plan also called for around-the-clock fighter patrols over Allied fleets. A final element included intensive fighter sweeps over Japanese airfields, and bombing Japanese runways, using delayed-action bombs making repairs more difficult.

Late in 1944, the British Pacific Fleet (BPF) used the high-altitude performance of its Supermarine Seafires (the naval version of the Spitfire) on combat air patrol duties. Seafires were involved in countering the kamikaze attacks during the Iwo Jima landings and beyond. The Seafires' best day was 15 August 1945, shooting down eight attacking aircraft with a single loss.

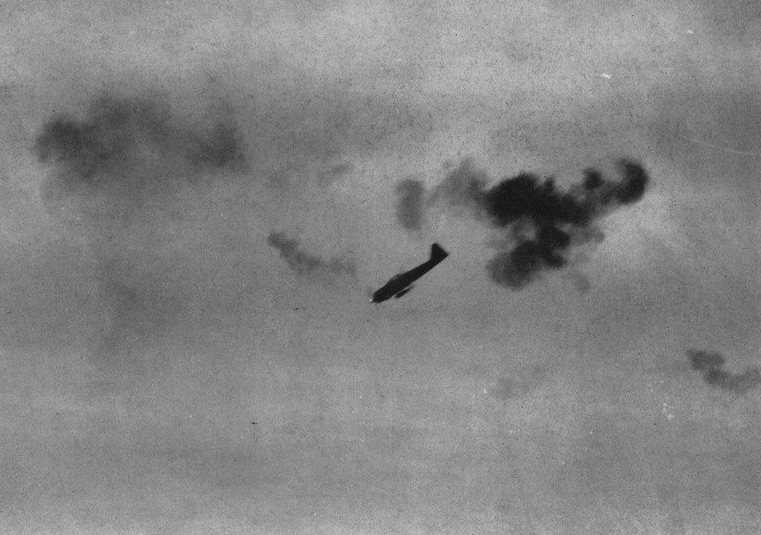
An A6M5 "Zero" diving towards American ships in the Philippines in early 1945

Allied pilots were more experienced, better trained and flying superior aircraft, making the poorly trained kamikaze pilots easy targets. The US Fast Carrier Task Force alone could bring over 1,000 fighter aircraft into play. Allied pilots became adept at destroying enemy aircraft before they struck ships.

Allied gunners had begun to develop techniques to negate kamikaze attacks. Light rapid-fire anti-aircraft weapons such as the 20 mm Oerlikon autocannons were still useful though the 40 mm Bofors was preferred; their high rate of fire and quick training remained advantageous, but they lacked the punch to take down a kamikaze bearing down on the ship they defended. It was found that heavy anti-aircraft guns such as the 5"/38 caliber gun (127 mm) were the most effective as they had sufficient firepower to destroy aircraft at a safe range from the ship, which was preferable since even a heavily damaged kamikaze could reach its target. The speedy Ohkas presented a very difficult problem for anti-aircraft fire, since their velocity made fire control extremely difficult. By 1945, large numbers of anti-aircraft shells with radiofrequency proximity fuzes, on average seven times more effective than regular shells, became available, and the US Navy recommended their use against kamikaze attacks.

=== Final phase ===
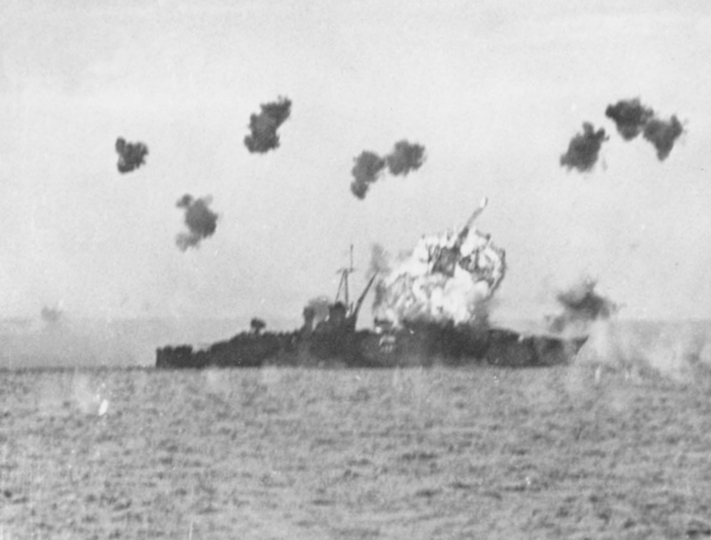
USS Louisville is struck by a Mitsubishi Ki-51 kamikaze at the Battle of Lingayen Gulf, 6 January 1945.

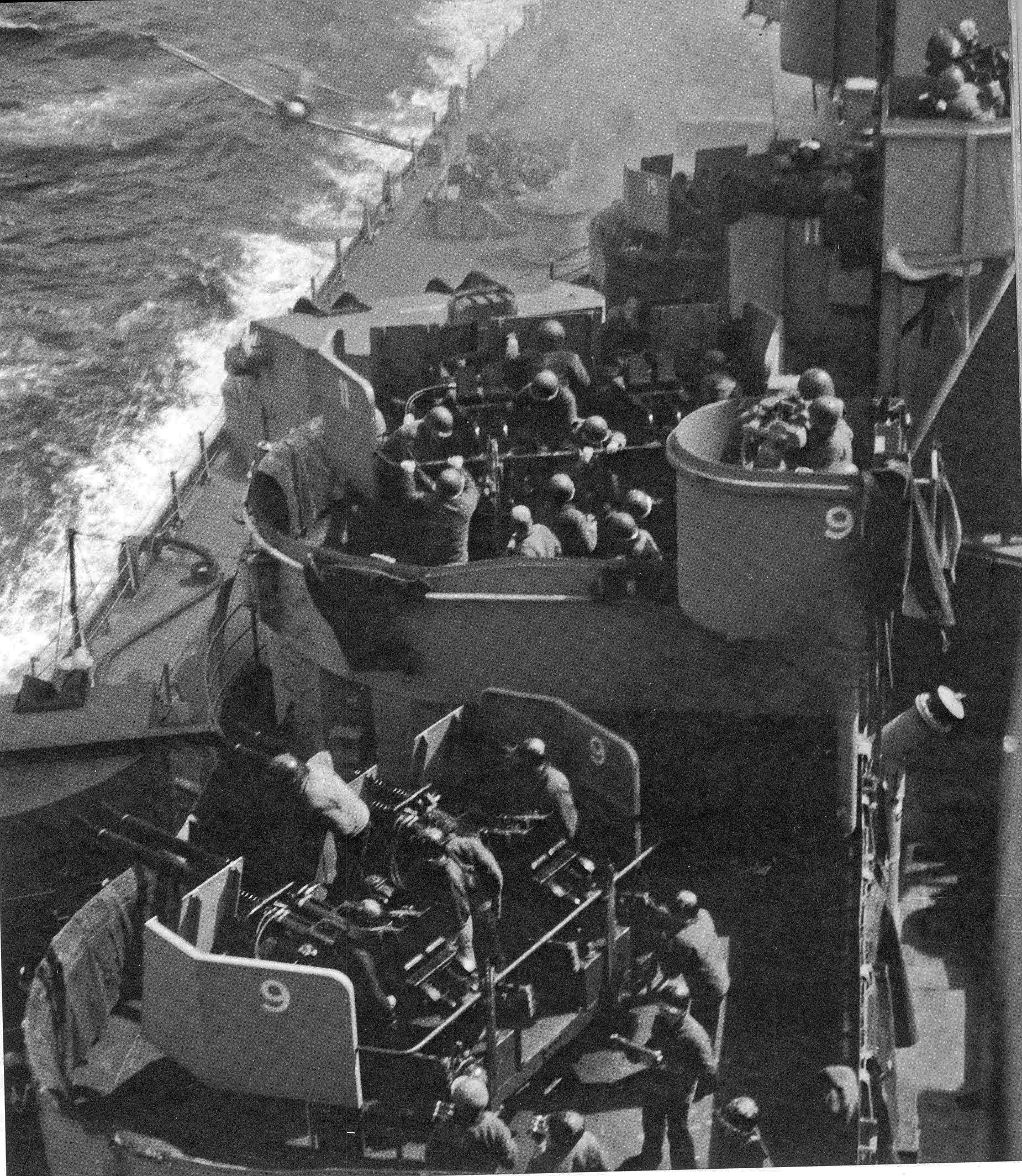
USS Missouri shortly before being hit by a Mitsubishi A6M Zero (visible top left), 11 April 1945. The damage was superficial, and no-one was killed apart from the pilot.

The peak period of kamikaze attack frequency came during April–June 1945 at the Battle of Okinawa. On 6 April 1945, waves of aircraft made hundreds of attacks in Operation Kikusui ("floating chrysanthemums"). At Okinawa, kamikaze attacks focused at first on Allied destroyers on picket duty, and then on the carriers in the middle of the fleet. Suicide attacks by aircraft or boats at Okinawa sank or put out of action at least 30 US warships and at least three US merchant ships, along with some from other Allied forces. The attacks expended 1,465 aircraft. Many warships of all classes were damaged, some severely, but no aircraft carriers, battleships or cruisers were sunk by kamikaze at Okinawa. Most of the ships lost were destroyers or smaller vessels, especially those on picket duty. The destroyer USS Laffey earned the nickname "The Ship That Would Not Die" after surviving six kamikaze attacks and four bomb hits during this battle.

American carriers, with their wooden flight decks, appeared to suffer more damage from kamikaze hits than the armored-decked carriers of the British Pacific Fleet. American carriers also suffered considerably heavier casualties from kamikaze strikes; for instance, 389 men were killed in one attack on USS Bunker Hill, greater than the combined number of fatalities suffered on all six Royal Navy armored carriers from all forms of attack during the entire war. Bunker Hill and Franklin were both hit (in Franklin's case, by a dive bomber, not a kamikaze) while conducting operations with fully fueled and armed aircraft spotted on deck for takeoff, an extremely vulnerable state for any carrier. Eight kamikaze hits on five British carriers resulted in only 20 deaths while a combined total of 15 bomb hits, most of 500 kg (1,100 lb) weight or greater, and one torpedo hit on four carriers caused 193 fatal casualties earlier in the war—striking proof of the protective value of the armored flight deck.

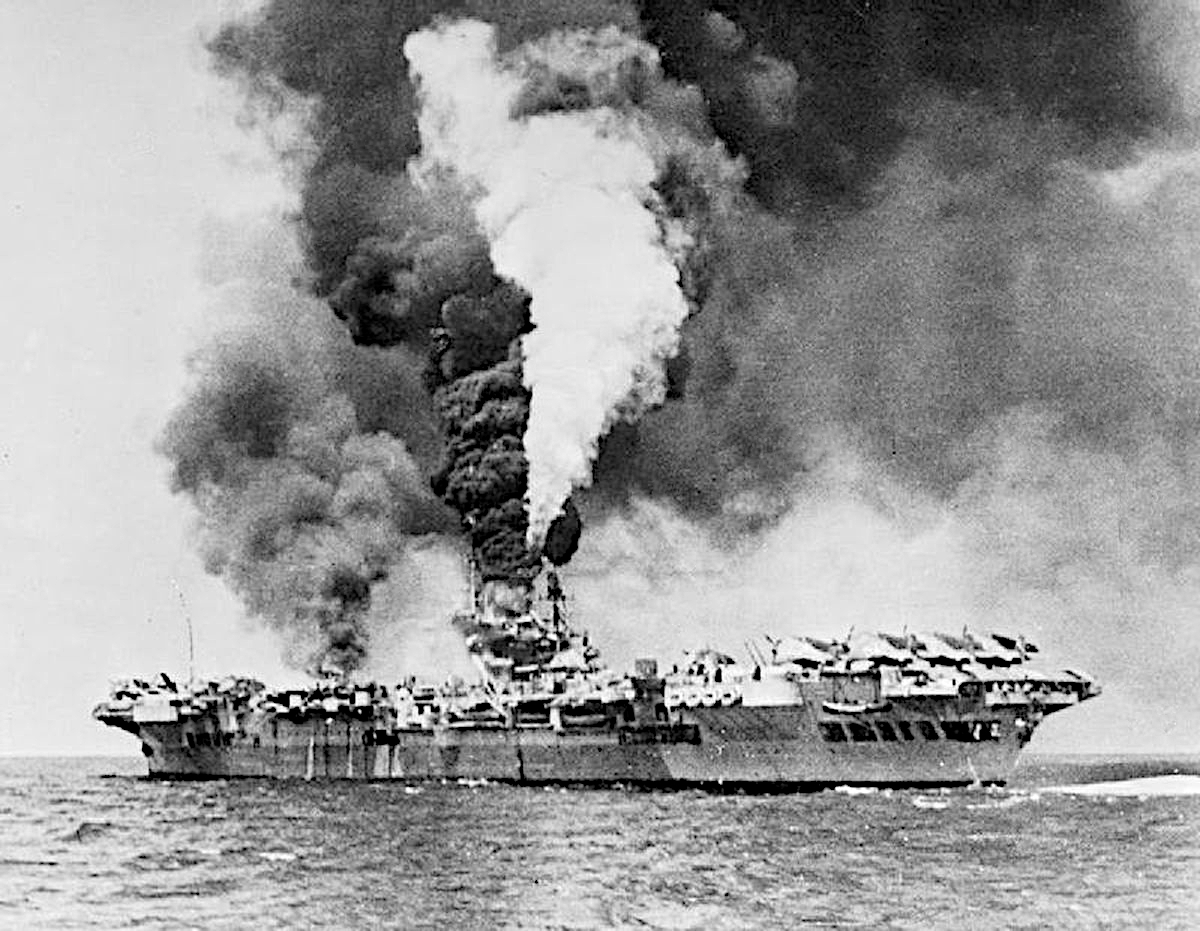
Aircraft carrier HMS Formidable after being struck by a kamikaze off the Sakishima Islands. The kamikaze made a dent 3 metres (10 ft) long and 0.6 metres (2 ft) wide and deep in the armored flight deck. Eight crew members were killed, 47 were wounded, and 11 aircraft were destroyed.

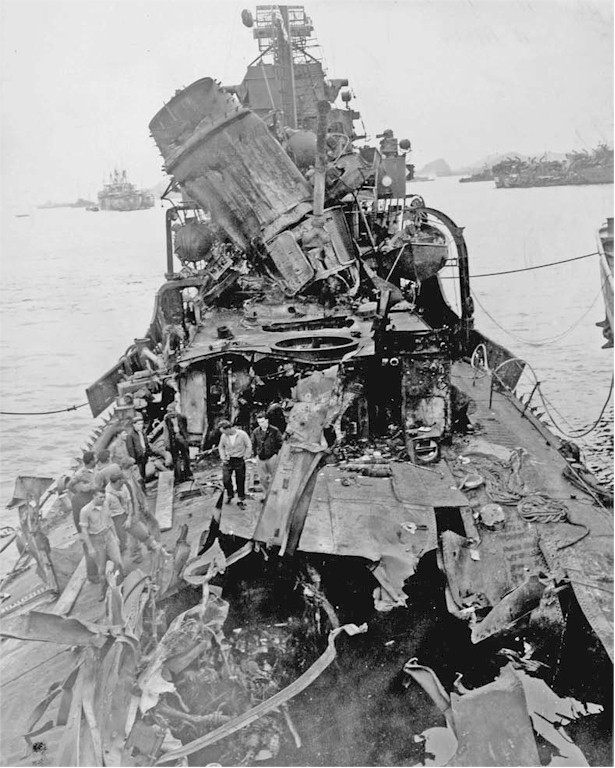
Kamikaze damage to the destroyer USS Newcomb following action off Okinawa. Newcomb was damaged beyond economical repair and scrapped post-war.

The resilience of well-armored vessels was shown on 4 May, just after 11:30, when there was a wave of suicide attacks against the British Pacific Fleet. One Japanese aircraft made a steep dive from "a great height" at the carrier HMS Formidable and was engaged by anti-aircraft guns. Although the kamikaze was hit by gunfire, it managed to drop a bomb that detonated on the flight deck, making a crater 3 m (10 ft) long, 0.6 m (2 ft) wide and 0.6 m (2 ft) deep. A long steel splinter speared down through the hangar deck and the main boiler room (where it ruptured a steam line) before coming to rest in a fuel tank near the aircraft park, where it started a major fire. Eight personnel were killed and 47 were wounded. One Corsair and ten Grumman Avengers were destroyed. The fires were gradually brought under control, and the crater in the deck was repaired with concrete and steel plate. By 17:00, Corsairs were able to land. On 9 May, Formidable was again damaged by a kamikaze, as were the carrier HMS Victorious and the battleship HMS Howe. The British were able to clear the flight deck and resume flight operations in just hours, while their American counterparts took a few days or even months, as observed by a US Navy liaison officer on HMS Indefatigable who commented: "When a kamikaze hits a US carrier it means six months of repair at Pearl Harbor. When a kamikaze hits a Limey carrier it's just a case of 'Sweepers, man your brooms'."

Twin-engine aircraft were occasionally used in kamikaze attacks. For example, Mitsubishi Ki-67 Hiryū ("Peggy") medium bombers, based on Formosa, undertook kamikaze attacks on Allied forces off Okinawa, while a pair of Kawasaki Ki-45 Toryu ("Nick") heavy fighters caused enough damage for the destroyer USS Dickerson to be scuttled. The last ship in the war to be sunk, the Fletcher-class destroyer USS Callaghan, was on a radar picket line off Okinawa when she was struck by an obsolete wood-and-fabric Yokosuka K5Y biplane.

During the final stage of World War II, the Imperial Japanese Army aviation employed numbers of kamikaze airstrikes against the Red Army during the Soviet–Japanese War in 1945. Between 9 August and 2 September 1945, several airstrikes involving kamikaze pilots were recorded. On 18 August, a Japanese Ki-45 flown by Lieutenant Yoshira Tsiohara attacked a tanker in the port of Vladivostok. The plane was shot down and the pilot was killed. He was found to have orders to attack the largest tanker in Vladivostok, and if he failed, to ram the biggest house in the city. On the same day, the Soviet minesweeper KT-152 was sunk during the Battle of Shumshu. It is believed to have been attacked by a kamikaze. In the middle of August the Japanese military planned to dispatch a group of 30 kamikaze pilots from Japan to Korea to attack Soviet warships, but the Japanese leadership decided to surrender and the operation was cancelled.

Kamikazes also operated against Red Army ground units. On August 10, three kamikazes attacked a tank column of the 20th Guards Tank Brigade. The paratroopers succeeded in shooting down two of the attacking aircraft, while the third crashed into a tank. During 12–13 August, 14 Japanese planes, including kamikazes, targeted tanks of the 5th Guards Tank Corps. Soviet fighter aviation, which managed to destroy three enemy aircraft and an anti-aircraft artillery which lost two planes participated in repulsing the air raids. Nine kamikazes crashed without hitting their targets. Damage from these attacks was negligible.

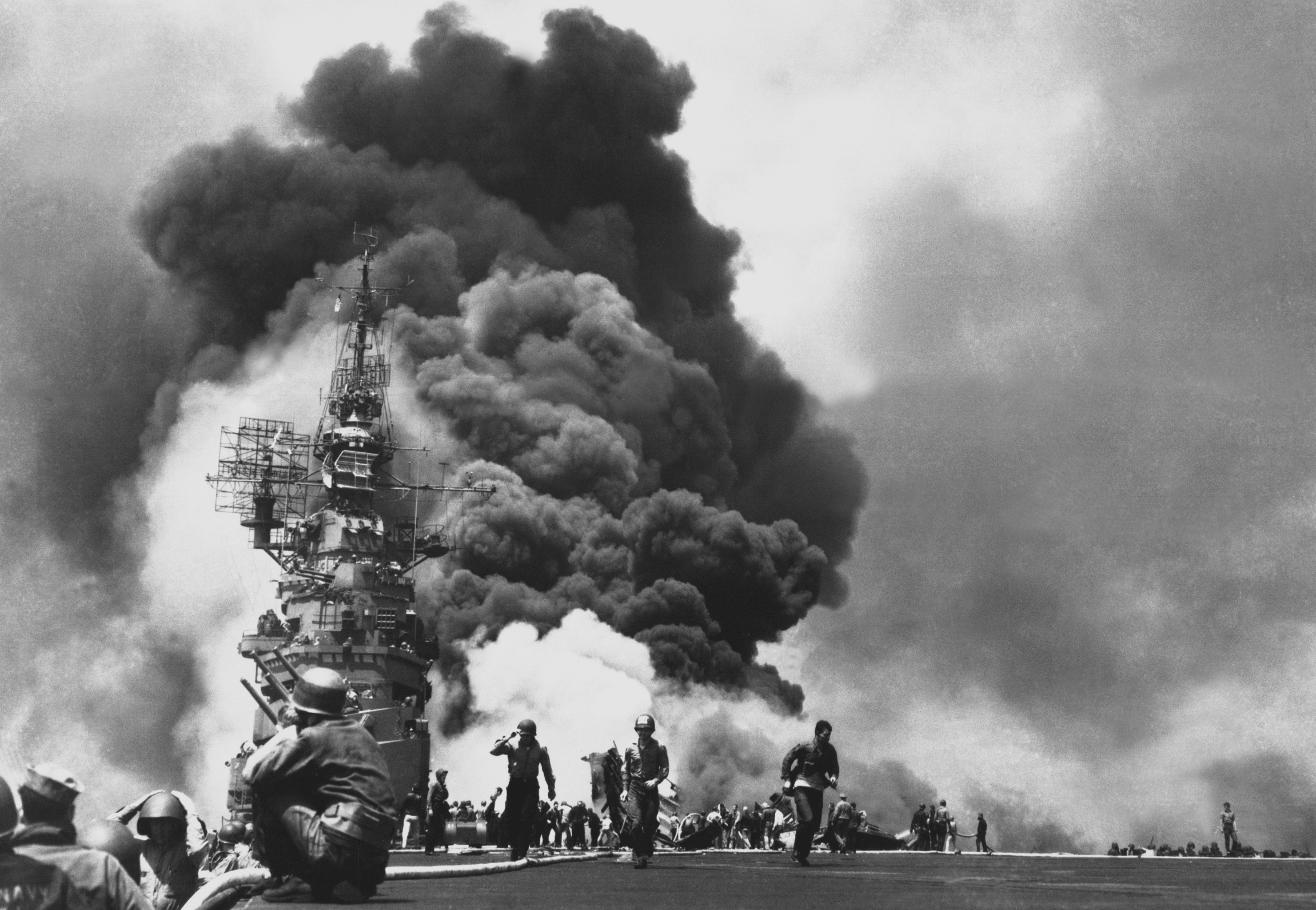
USS Bunker Hill, an aircraft carrier, was hit by two kamikazes on 11 May 1945, resulting in 396 personnel dead or missing and over 260 wounded.

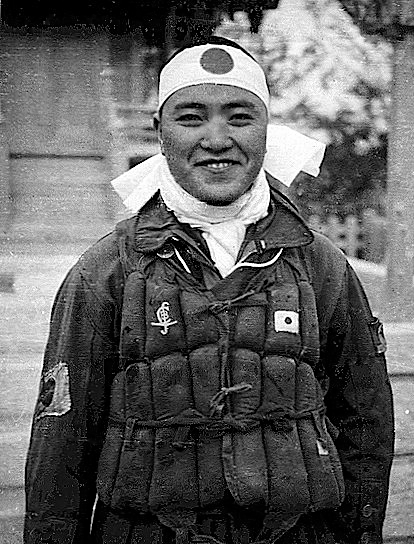
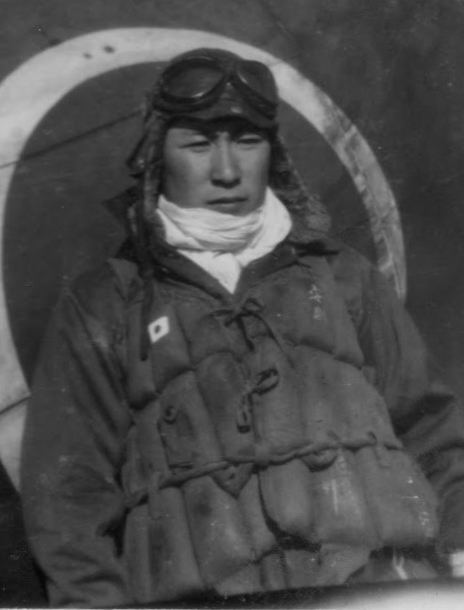
Kiyoshi Ogawa (left), 22, and Seizō Yasunori, 21, the pilots who flew their aircraft into Bunker Hill

On 17 August, the Kwantung Army command ordered its units to surrender, but some of the pilots disobeyed and the Japanese air attacks continued. On 18 August, convoys of the 20th and 21st Armored Brigade were attacked. The kamikazes traded six of their aircraft for a tank and a couple of cars. The kamikazes also flew solo. On 18 August, several ammunition resupply vehicles carrying ammunition for BM-13 were destroyed by a kamikaze in the Tao'an area. The personnel were unharmed, as they managed to evade the raid. On 19 August, nine aircraft raided the tanks of the 21st Guards Tank Brigade. Seven were shot down, but two planes broke through; one tank was destroyed and the other damaged. About the raid, the author of the book Tanker on a foreign vehicle D. Loza recalls six Japanese aircraft attacked the convoy, which damaged one Sherman tank and destroyed a medical vehicle. Japanese commanders ordered weapons depots to be secured and the propellers of aircraft on airfields to be removed to stop these sorties. Supposedly, the kamikazes carried out more than 50 suicide attacks against the Soviet Red Army in August 1945. That is the number of aircraft the Japanese attributed to "other losses". Overall, the kamikaze airstrikes proved ineffective and had little or no effect on the Red Army during the Soviet–Japanese War.

Vice Admiral Matome Ugaki, the commander of the IJN 5th Air Fleet based in Kyushu, participated in one of the final kamikaze attacks on American ships on 15 August 1945, hours after Japan's announced surrender.

On 19 August 1945, 11 young officers under Second Lieutenant Hitoshi Imada, attached to the 675th Manchuria Detachment, accompanied by two women of their engagement, left the Daikosan airfield and made a final aerial suicide attack against one of the Soviet armored units that had invaded Manchuria known as the Shinshu Fumetsu Special Attack Corps (Japanese: 神州不滅特別攻撃隊), The last kamikaze attacks were recorded on 20 August 1945. Shortly afterward, the main strength of the Japanese Army began to lay down its arms in surrender per the Emperor's broadcast. The Soviet–Japanese War, and World War II, had come to an end.

At the time of the surrender, the Japanese had more than 9,000 aircraft in the home islands available for kamikaze attacks, and more than 5,000 had already been specially fitted for suicide attack to resist the planned either American or Soviet invasion.

== Effects ==
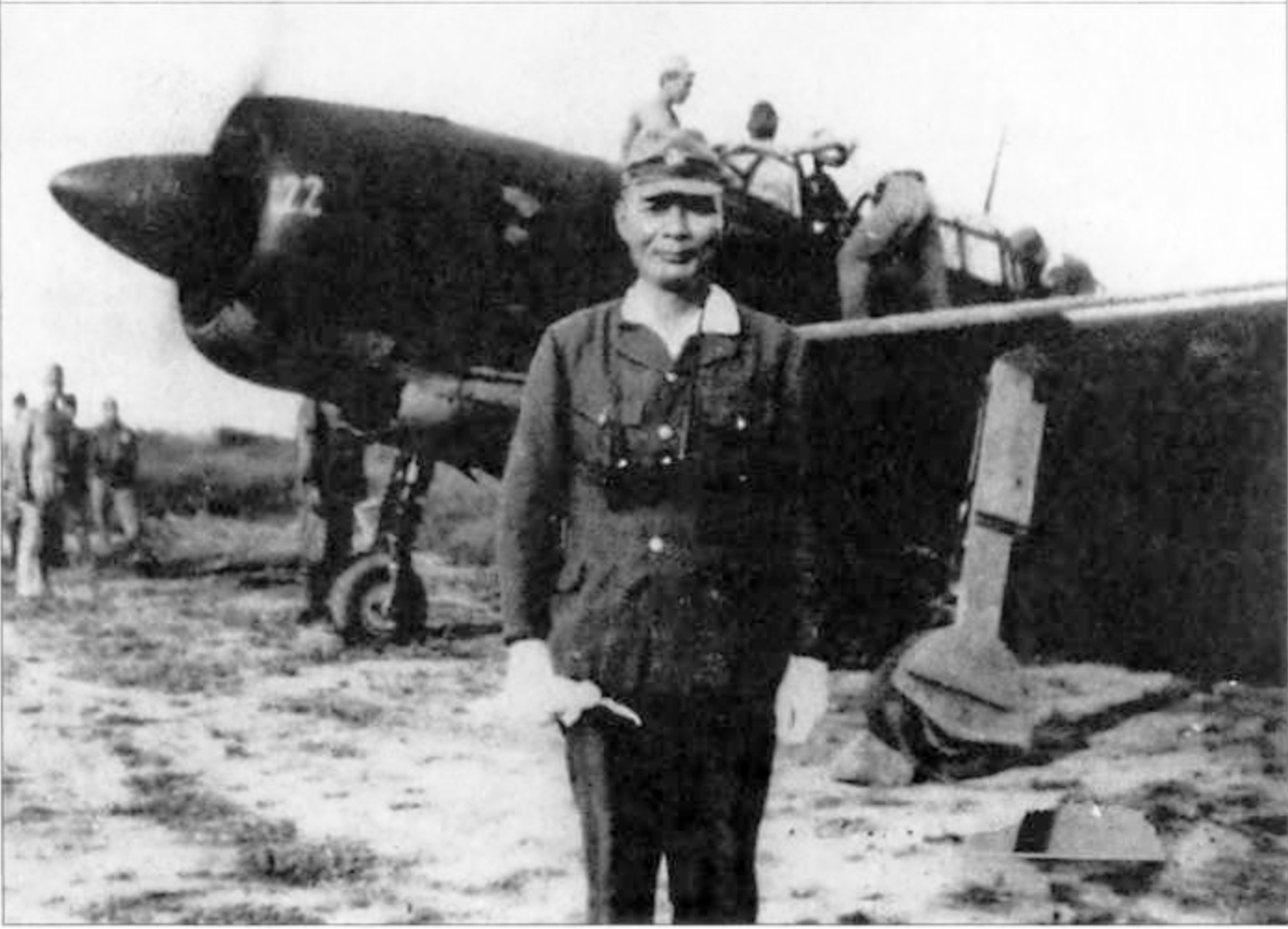
Ugaki, shortly before taking off in a Yokosuka D4Y to participate in one of the final kamikaze strikes, 15 August 1945

As the end of the war approached, the Allies did not suffer more serious significant losses, despite having far more ships and facing a greater intensity of kamikaze attacks. Although causing some of the heaviest casualties on US carriers in 1945 (particularly as Bunker Hill was unlucky to be hit with fueled and armed aircraft on deck), the IJN had sacrificed 2,525 kamikaze pilots and the IJAAF 1,387 – without successfully sinking any fleet carriers, cruisers, or battleships. This was far more than the IJN had lost in 1942 when it sank or crippled three US fleet carriers (albeit without inflicting significant casualties). In 1942, when US Navy vessels were scarce, the temporary absence of key warships from the combat zone would tie up operational initiatives. By 1945, however, the US Navy was large enough that damaged ships could be detached back home for repair without much hampering the fleet's operational capability. The only US surface losses were escort carriers, destroyers, and smaller ships, all of which lacked the armor protection or capability to sustain heavy damage. Overall, the kamikazes were unable to turn the tide of the war and stop the Allied invasion.

While on paper it may appear that kamikaze and kamikaze-assisted attacks at Okinawa only managed to sink smaller ships like destroyers, the reality is different. Kamikaze raids often included escort fighters and conventional bombers piloted by skilled aviators who were not intended to execute suicide strikes. These coordinated groups, such as the one that paved the way for conventional bombers to successfully strike the fleet carrier Franklin, were crucial. In fact, three large fleet carriers—Franklin, Bunker Hill, and Enterprise—were so heavily damaged by kamikaze-related attacks that they were knocked out for the remainder of the war.

For the Japanese this was not much different than sinking them, operationally speaking. For each of the heavily damaged aircraft carriers dozens of aircraft were destroyed that would have been impossible to be shot down by any Japanese forces via dogfights or anti-aircraft weapons at this stage of the war. Franklin lost 59 planes, Bunker Hill lost 78 planes, and Enterprise lost 25 planes in the Japanese attacks that ended the war for them. There were more lost planes on these three carriers alone (not including the numerous other successful strikes on other Allied carriers during the Battle of Okinawa) than the United States lost in the entire Battle of Midway. Franklin and Bunker Hill also both had the first and third largest fatalities on sunken or damaged US aircraft carriers in World War II and were the only Essex-class carriers to never serve on active duty after World War II while Enterprise was mothballed soon after World War II despite all three of them receiving repairs back in the United States. Numerous other larger-than-destroyer warships were so heavily damaged that they also were knocked out for the rest of the war and decommissioned shortly after World War II.

The Japanese kamikazes were so relentless at Okinawa that United States Fifth Fleet commander Admiral Raymond A. Spruance's flagships were struck two separate times (Indianapolis was hit in March and had to retire for repairs which forced him to transfer to New Mexico which was also hit in May). Fast Carrier Task Force commander Vice Admiral Marc Mitscher and his chief of staff Commodore Arleigh Burke were yards away from getting killed or wounded by kamikazes on his flagship Bunker Hill, which killed three of Mitscher's staff officers and eleven of his enlisted staff members and also destroyed his flag cabin along with all of his uniforms, personal papers, and possessions. Just three days later Mitscher's new flagship Enterprise was also struck by a kamikaze, forcing him to have to change his flagship yet again.

Spruance later wrote about the effectiveness of kamikazes:

This is my second experience with a suicide plane making a hit on board my own ship, and I have seen four other ships hit near me. The suicide plane is a very effective weapon, which we must not underestimate. I do not believe anyone who has not been around within its area of operations can realize its potentialities against ships. It is the opposite extreme of a lot of our Army heavy bombers who bomb safely and ineffectively from the upper atmosphere.

In the immediate aftermath of kamikaze strikes, British fleet carriers with their armoured flight decks recovered more quickly compared to their US counterparts. Post-war analysis showed that some British carriers such as HMS Formidable suffered structural damage that led to them being scrapped, as being beyond economic repair. Britain's post-war economic situation played a role in the decision to not repair damaged carriers, while even seriously damaged American carriers such as USS Bunker Hill were repaired, although they were then mothballed or sold off as surplus after World War II without re-entering service.

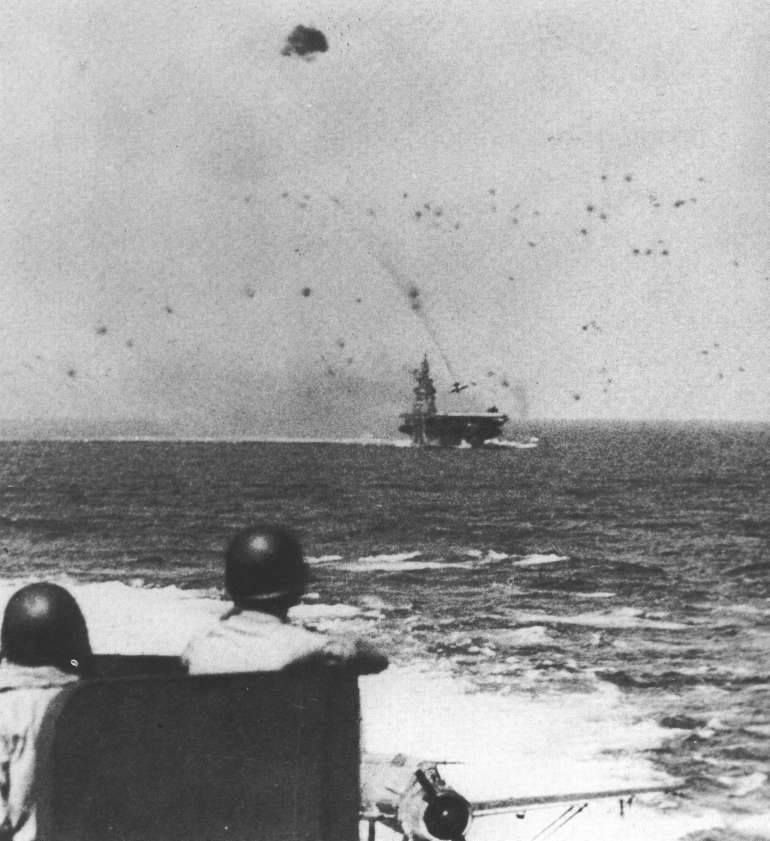
A crewman in an AA gun aboard the battleship New Jersey watches a kamikaze aircraft dive at Intrepid 25 November 1944. Over 75 men were killed or missing and 100 wounded.

The exact number of ships sunk is a matter of debate. According to a wartime Japanese propaganda announcement, the missions sank 81 ships and damaged 195, and according to a Japanese tally, kamikaze attacks accounted for up to 80% of the US losses in the final phase of the war in the Pacific. In a 2004 book, World War II, the historians Willmott, Cross, and Messenger stated that more than 70 US vessels were "sunk or damaged beyond repair" by kamikazes.

According to the United States Strategic Bombing Survey, from October 1944 until the end of the war, 2,550 Kamikaze missions were flown with only 475 (or 18.6%) achieving a hit or a damaging near miss. Warships of all types were damaged including 12 aircraft carriers, 15 battleships, and 16 light and escort carriers. However, no ship larger than an escort carrier was sunk. Approximately 45 ships were sunk, the bulk of which were destroyers. To the United States, the losses were of such concern that more than 2,000 B-29 sorties were diverted from attacking Japanese cities and industries to striking Kamikaze air fields in Kyushu.

According to a US Air Force webpage:

Approximately 2,800 Kamikaze attackers sank 34 Navy ships, damaged 368 others, killed 4,900 sailors, and wounded over 4,800. Despite radar detection and cuing, airborne interception, attrition, and massive anti-aircraft barrages, 14 per cent of Kamikazes survived to score a hit on a ship; nearly 8.5 percent of all ships hit by Kamikazes sank.

Australian journalists Denis and Peggy Warner, in a 1982 book with Japanese naval historian Sadao Seno (The Sacred Warriors: Japan's Suicide Legions), arrived at a total of 57 ships sunk by kamikazes. Bill Gordon, an American Japanologist who specializes in kamikazes, lists in a 2007 article 47 ships known to have been sunk by kamikaze aircraft. Gordon says that the Warners and Seno included ten ships that did not sink. He lists:

- three escort carriers: USS St. Lo, USS Ommaney Bay, and USS Bismarck Sea
- fourteen destroyers, including the last ship to be sunk, USS Callaghan on 29 July 1945, off Okinawa
- three high-speed transport ships
- five Landing Ship, Tank
- four Landing Ship Medium
- three Landing Ship Medium (Rocket)
- one auxiliary tanker
- three Victory ships
- three Liberty ships
- two high-speed minesweepers
- one Auk-class minesweeper
- one submarine chaser
- two PT boats
- two Landing Craft Support

== Recruitment ==
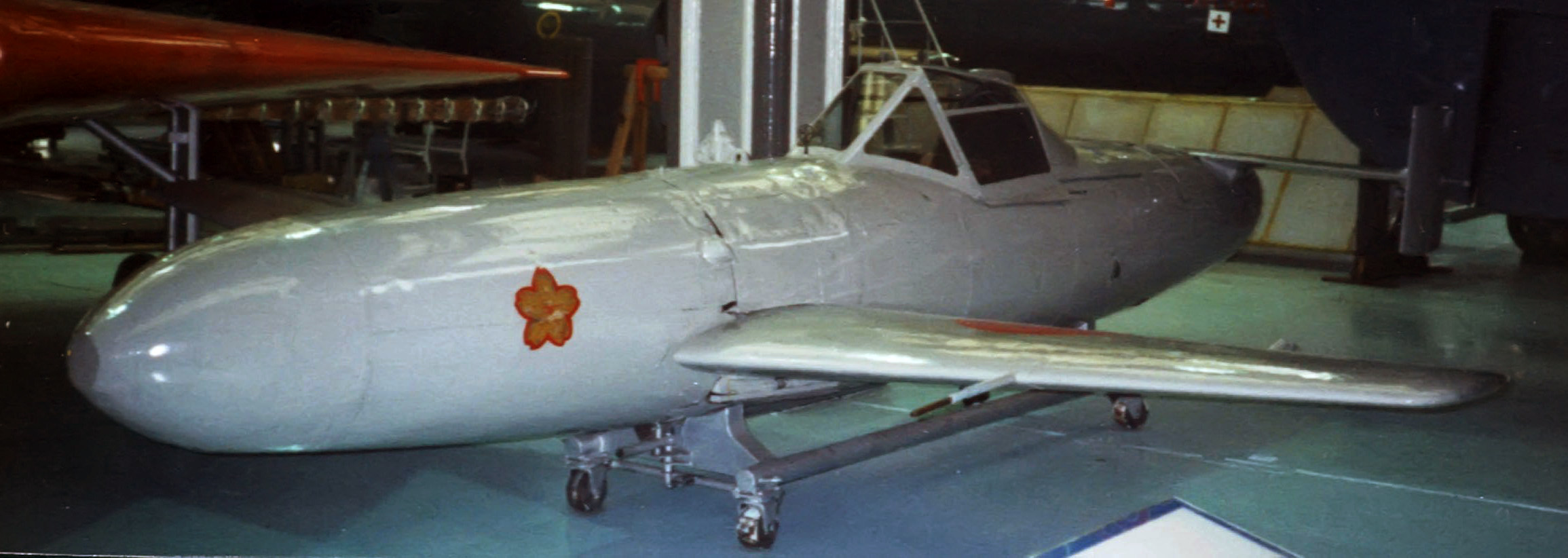
Japanese Yokosuka MXY-7 Ohka ("cherry blossom"), a specially built rocket-powered kamikaze aircraft used towards the end of the war. The US called them Baka Bombs ("idiot bombs").

It was claimed by the Japanese forces at the time that there were many volunteers for the suicidal forces. Captain Motoharu Okamura commented that "there were so many volunteers for suicide missions that he referred to them as a swarm of bees", explaining: "Bees die after they have stung." Okamura is credited with being the first to propose the kamikaze attacks. He had expressed his desire to lead a volunteer group of suicide attacks some four months before Admiral Takijiro Ohnishi, commander of the Japanese naval air forces in the Philippines, presented the idea to his staff. While Vice-Admiral Shigeru Fukudome, commander of the second air fleet, was inspecting the 341st Air Group, Captain Okamura took the chance to express his ideas on crash-dive tactics:

In our present situation, I firmly believe that the only way to swing the war in our favor is to resort to crash-dive attacks with our aircraft. There is no other way. There will be more than enough volunteers for this chance to save our country, and I would like to command such an operation. Provide me with 300 aircraft and I will turn the tide of war.

When the volunteers arrived for duty in the corps, there were twice as many persons as aircraft available. "After the war, some commanders would express regret for allowing superfluous crews to accompany sorties, sometimes squeezing themselves aboard bombers and fighters so as to encourage the suicide pilots and, it seems, join in the exultation of sinking a large enemy vessel." Many of the kamikaze pilots believed their death would pay the debt they owed and show the love they had for their families, friends, and emperor. "So eager were many minimally trained pilots to take part in suicide missions that when their sorties were delayed or aborted, the pilots became deeply despondent. Many of those who were selected for a body crashing mission were described as being extraordinarily blissful immediately before their final sortie."

However, an evidence-based study of 2,000 pilots' uncensored letters revealed that the pilots candidly expressed myriad emotions in private. Typically, they declared their determination to die to protect the homeland and thanked their school teachers, parents, siblings, and friends for their selfless devotion. Although most pilots were unmarried (the average age was 19), some young fathers left loving instructions for their young wives and children to live well, and others expressed memories of unrequited love or the sorrow of dying young.

As time wore on, modern critics questioned the nationalist portrayal of kamikaze pilots as noble soldiers willing to sacrifice their lives for the country. In 2006, Tsuneo Watanabe, editor-in-chief of the Yomiuri Shimbun, criticized Japanese nationalists' glorification of kamikaze attacks:

It's all a lie that they left filled with braveness and joy, crying, "Long live the emperor!" They were sheep at a slaughterhouse. Everybody was looking down and tottering. Some were unable to stand up and were carried and pushed into their aircraft by maintenance soldiers.

== Training ==
When you eliminate all thoughts about life and death, you will be able to totally disregard your earthly life. This will also enable you to concentrate your attention on eradicating the enemy with unwavering determination, meanwhile reinforcing your excellence in flight skills.

— Excerpt from a kamikaze pilots' manual,

Tokkōtai pilot training, as described by Takeo Kasuga, generally "consisted of incredibly strenuous training, coupled with cruel and torturous corporal punishment as a daily routine". The training, in theory, lasted for thirty days, but because of American raids and shortage of fuel it could last up to two months.

Daikichi Irokawa, who trained at Tsuchiura Naval Air Base, recalled that he "was struck on the face so hard and frequently that [his] face was no longer recognizable". He also wrote: "I was hit so hard that I could no longer see and fell on the floor. The minute I got up, I was hit again by a club so that I would confess." This brutal "training" was justified by the idea that it would instil a "soldier's fighting spirit", but daily beatings and corporal punishment eliminated patriotism among many pilots.

We tried to live with 120 per cent intensity, rather than waiting for death. We read and read, trying to understand why we had to die in our early twenties. We felt the clock ticking away towards our death, every sound of the clock shortening our lives.

— Irokawa Daikichi, Kamikaze Diaries: Reflections of Japanese Student Soldiers

Pilots were given a manual that detailed how they were supposed to think, prepare, and attack. From this manual, pilots were told to "attain a high level of spiritual training", and to "keep [their] health in the very best condition". These instructions, among others, were meant to make pilots mentally ready to die.

The tokkōtai pilot's manual also explained how a pilot may turn back if he could not locate a target, and that a pilot "should not waste [his] life lightly". One pilot, a graduate from Waseda University, who continually came back to base was executed after his ninth return.

The manual was very detailed in how a pilot should attack. A pilot would dive towards his target and "aim for a point between the bridge tower and the smokestacks". Entering a smokestack was also said to be "effective". Pilots were told not to aim at a carrier's bridge tower but instead to target the elevators or the flight deck. For horizontal attacks, the pilot was to "aim at the middle of the vessel, slightly higher than the waterline" or to "aim at the entrance to the aircraft hangar, or the bottom of the stack" if the former was too difficult.

The tokkōtai pilot's manual told pilots to never close their eyes, as this would lower the chances of hitting their targets. In the final moments before the crash, the pilot was to yell "hissatsu" (必殺) at the top of his lungs, which translates to "certain kill" or "sink without fail".

== Cultural background ==
In 1944–45, US military leaders invented the term "State Shinto" as part of the Shinto Directive to differentiate the Japanese state's ideology from traditional Shinto practices. As time went on, Americans claimed, Shinto was used increasingly in the promotion of nationalist sentiment. In 1890, the Imperial Rescript on Education was passed, under which students were required to ritually recite its oath to offer themselves "courageously to the state" as well as protect the Imperial family. The ultimate offering was to give up one's life. It was an honour to die for Japan and the Emperor. Axell and Kase pointed out: "The fact is that innumerable soldiers, sailors and pilots were determined to die, to become eirei, that is 'guardian spirits' of the country. ... Many Japanese felt that to be enshrined at Yasukuni was a special honour because the Emperor visited the shrine to pay homage twice a year. Yasukuni is the only shrine deifying common men which the Emperor would visit to pay his respects." Young Japanese people were indoctrinated from an early age with these ideals.

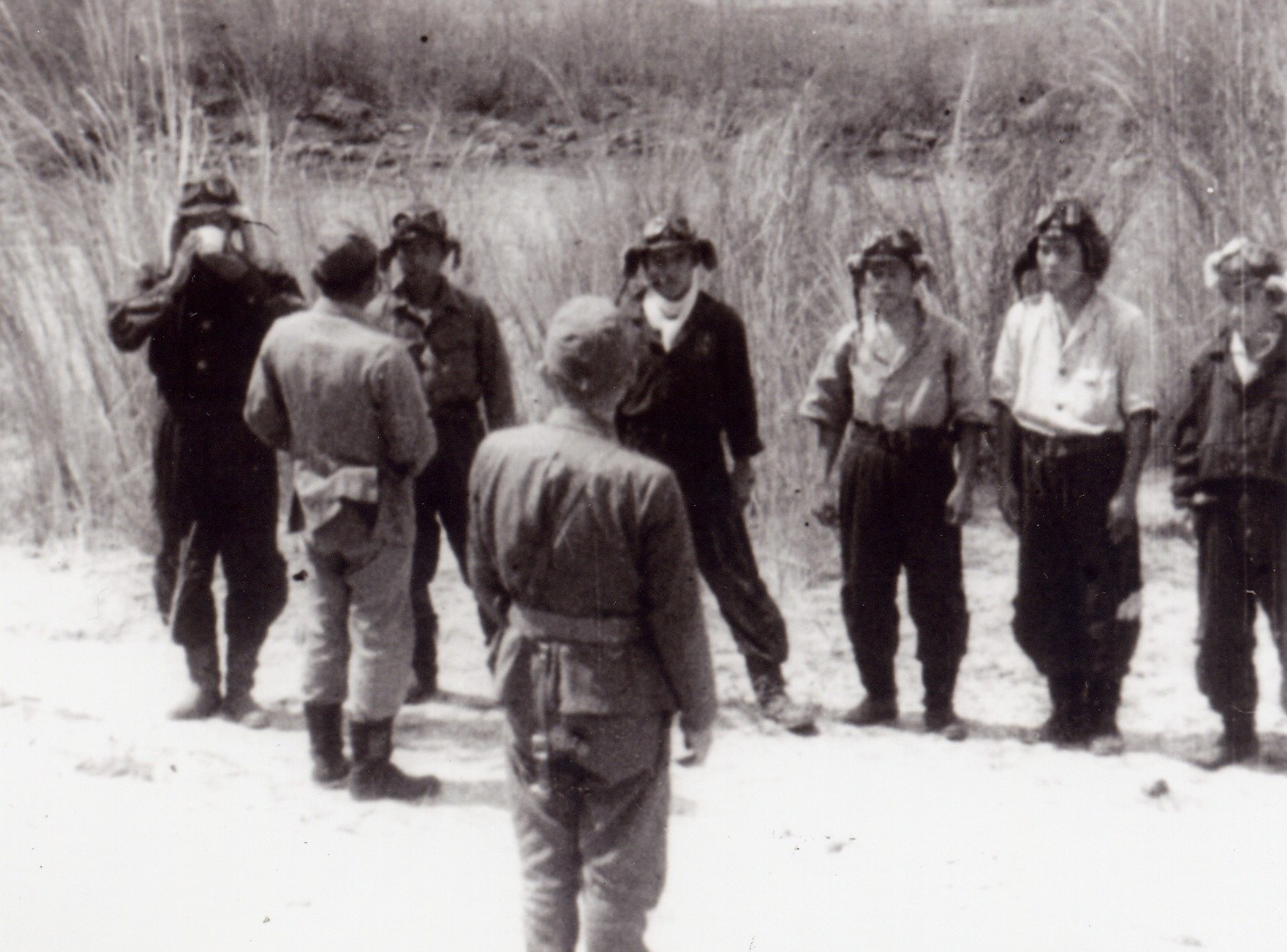
First recruits for Japanese Kamikaze suicide pilots in 1944

Following the commencement of the kamikaze tactic, newspapers and books ran advertisements, articles and stories regarding the suicide bombers to aid in recruiting and support. In October 1944, the Nippon Times quoted Lieutenant Sekio Nishina: "The spirit of the Special Attack Corps is the great spirit that runs in the blood of every Japanese ... The crashing action which simultaneously kills the enemy and oneself without fail is called the Special Attack ... Every Japanese is capable of becoming a member of the Special Attack Corps." Publishers also played up the idea that the kamikaze were enshrined at Yasukuni and ran exaggerated stories of kamikaze bravery—there were even fairy tales for little children that promoted the kamikaze. A Foreign Office official named Toshikazu Kase said: "It was customary for GHQ [in Tokyo] to make false announcements of victory in utter disregard of facts, and for the elated and complacent public to believe them."

While many stories were falsified, some were true, such as that of Kiyu Ishikawa, who saved a Japanese ship when he crashed his aircraft into a torpedo that an American submarine had launched. The sergeant-major was posthumously promoted to second lieutenant by the emperor and was enshrined at Yasukuni. Stories like these, which showed the kind of praise and honour death produced, encouraged young Japanese to volunteer for the Special Attack Corps and instilled a desire in the youth to die as a kamikaze.

Ceremonies were carried out before kamikaze pilots departed on their final mission. The kamikaze shared ceremonial cups of sake or water known as "mizu no sakazuki". Many kamikaze Army officers took their swords along, while the Navy pilots (as a general rule) did not. The kamikaze, along with all Japanese aviators flying over unfriendly territory, were issued (or purchased, if they were officers) a Nambu pistol with which to end their lives if they risked being captured. Like all Army and Navy servicemen, the kamikaze would wear their senninbari, a "belt of a thousand stitches" given to them by their mothers. They also composed and read a death poem, a tradition stemming from the samurai, who did so before committing seppuku. Pilots carried prayers from their families and were given military decorations. The kamikaze were escorted by other pilots whose function was to protect them en route to their destination and report on the results. Some of these escort pilots, such as Zero pilot Toshimitsu Imaizumi, were later sent out on their own kamikaze missions.

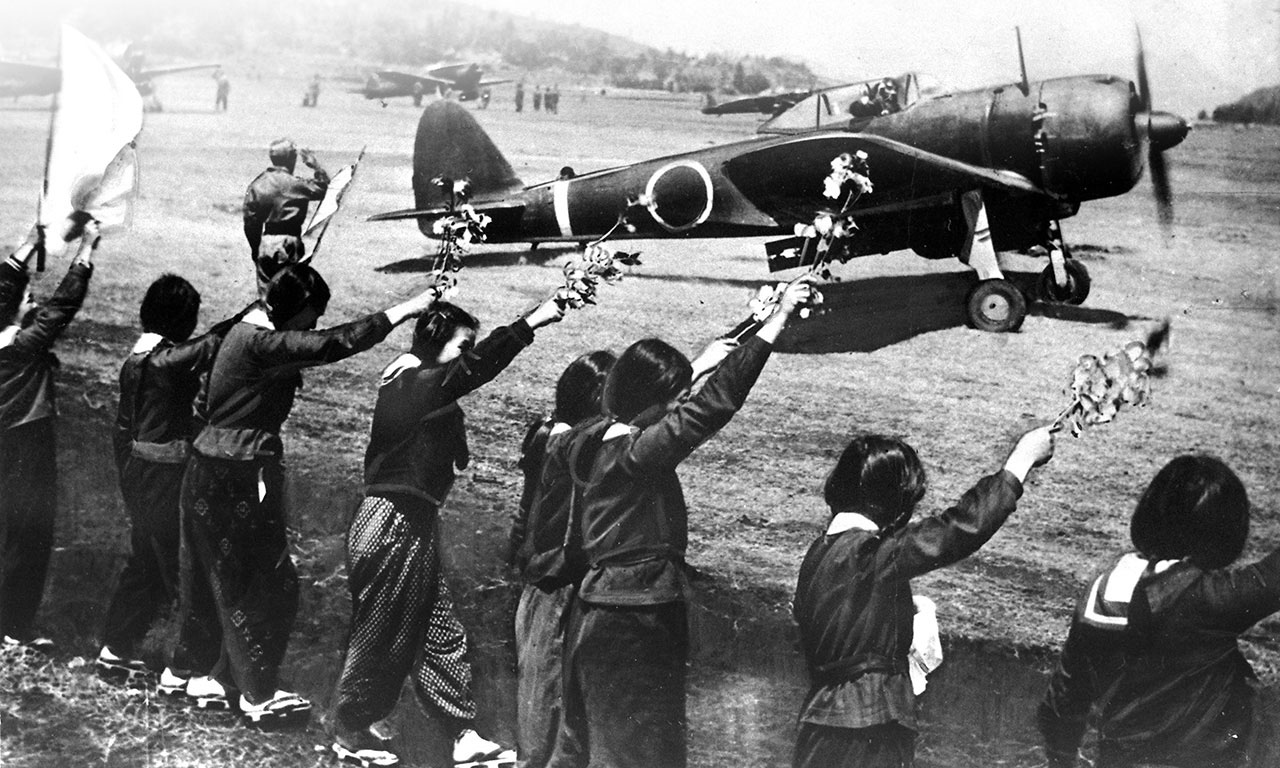
Chiran high school girls wave farewell with cherry blossom branches to departing kamikaze pilot Toshio Anazawa in a Nakajima Ki-43-IIIa Hayabusa.

While it is commonly perceived that volunteers signed up in droves for kamikaze missions, it has also been contended that there was extensive coercion and peer pressure involved in recruiting soldiers for the sacrifice. Their motivations in "volunteering" were complex and not simply about patriotism or bringing honour to their families. Firsthand interviews with surviving kamikaze and escort pilots has revealed that they were motivated by a desire to protect their families from perceived atrocities and possible extinction at the hands of the Allies. They viewed themselves as the last defense.

At least one of these pilots was a conscripted Korean with a Japanese name, adopted under the pre-war Soshi-kaimei ordinance that compelled Koreans to take Japanese personal names. Eleven of the 1,036 IJA kamikaze pilots who died in sorties from Chiran and other Japanese air bases during the Battle of Okinawa were Koreans.

It is said that young pilots on kamikaze missions often flew southwest from Japan over the 922 m (3,025 ft) Mount Kaimon. The mountain is also called "Satsuma Fuji" (meaning a mountain like Mount Fuji but located in the Satsuma Province region). Suicide-mission pilots looked over their shoulders to see the mountain, the southernmost on the Japanese mainland, said farewell to their country and saluted the mountain. Residents on Kikaishima Island, east of Amami Ōshima, say that pilots from suicide-mission units dropped flowers from the air as they departed on their final missions.

Kamikaze pilots who were unable to complete their missions (because of mechanical failure, interception, etc.) were stigmatized in the years following the war. This stigma began to diminish some 50 years after the war as scholars and publishers began to distribute the survivors' stories.

Some Japanese military personnel were critical of the policy. Officers such as Minoru Genda, Tadashi Minobe and Yoshio Shiga, refused to obey the policy. They said that the commander of a kamikaze attack should engage in the task first. Some persons who obeyed the policy, such as Kiyokuma Okajima, Saburo Shindo and Iyozo Fujita, were also critical of the policy. Saburō Sakai said: "We never dared to question orders, to doubt authority, to do anything but immediately carry out all the commands of our superiors. We were automatons who obeyed without thinking." Tetsuzō Iwamoto refused to engage in a kamikaze attack because he thought the task of fighter pilots was to shoot down aircraft.

== Film ==
- Saigo no Tokkōtai (最後の特攻隊, The Last Kamikaze in English), released in 1970, produced by Toei, directed by Junya Sato and starring Kōji Tsuruta, Ken Takakura and Shinichi Chiba
- Toei also produced a biographical film about Takijirō Ōnishi in 1974 called Ā Kessen Kōkūtai (あゝ決戦航空隊, Father of the Kamikaze in English), directed by Kōsaku Yamashita.
- The Cockpit, an anthology of short films containing one about a kamikaze pilot
- Masami Takahashi, Last Kamikaze Testimonials from WWII Suicide Pilots (Watertown, MA: Documentary Educational Resources, 2008)
- Risa Morimoto, Wings of Defeat (Harriman, NY: New Day Films, 2007)
- Ore wa, kimi no tameni koso (2007, For Those We Love in English)
- Assault on the Pacific – Kamikaze (2007), directed by Taku Shinjo (Original title: "俺は、君のためにこそ死ににいく" Ore wa, Kimi no Tame ni Koso Shini ni Iku)
- The Eternal Zero (永遠の0 Eien no Zero) a 2013 film directed by Takashi Yamazaki based on the 2006 novel of the same name by Naoki Hyakuta.
- Godzilla Minus One (ゴジラ, Gojira Mainasu Wan) a 2023 film also directed by Takashi Yamazaki set in the Godzilla franchise, follows kamikaze deserter Kōichi Shikishima as he encounters the monster Godzilla in postwar Japan.

== See also ==
- Aerial ramming
- Banzai charge
- Chiran Peace Museum for Kamikaze Pilots
- Hachimaki
- Kampfgeschwader 200 § Suicide and near-suicide missions
- List of Imperial Japanese Navy air-to-surface special attack units
- List of Imperial Japanese Army air-to-surface special attack units
- List of ships damaged by kamikaze attack
- Leonidas Squadron
- Human torpedo
- Ryōji Uehara
- September 11 attacks
- Shinpūren rebellion
- Smertnik
- Sonderkommando Elbe
- Suicide by pilot
- Suicide weapon
