= Yukio Seki =

Japanese kamikaze pilot

- 関 行男
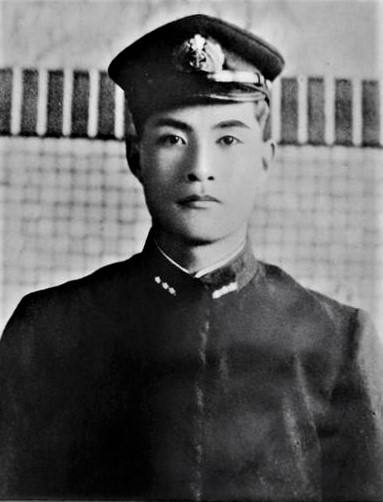
- Born: August 29, 1921; Iyo Saijō, Ehime, Japan
- Died: October 25, 1944 (aged 23); USS St. Lo (CVE-63), Leyte Gulf, Philippines
- Military career
- Allegiance: Empire of Japan
- Branch: Imperial Japanese Navy Air Service (IJN)
- Service years: 1938–1944
- Conflicts: World War II; Pacific War; Battle of Midway; Battle of Leyte Gulf †

Yukio Seki (関 行男, Seki Yukio; August 29, 1921 – October 25, 1944) was a Japanese naval aviator of the Imperial Japanese Navy during World War II. As a kamikaze pilot, Lieutenant Seki led one of the three fighter groups of the second official kamikaze attack in World War II (the first official attack was an unsuccessful attempt led by Yoshiyasu Kunō on October 21, 1944). Seki's final action took place on October 25, 1944, during the Battle of Leyte Gulf. He led a unit of five bomb-armed Mitsubishi Zero fighters, crash-diving his plane deliberately into USS St. Lo's flight deck, being the first kamikazes to sink an enemy ship.

== Early life ==
Yukio Seki was born on August 29, 1921 in Iyo Saijō, a small town in Shikoku. His parents ran an antiques store specializing in tea ceremony utensils. At an early age, Seki was exposed to naval training courses at his middle school and planned a career in the Navy. Since naval personnel were fully prepared to die in battle, and since Yukio was an only child, the family adopted a daughter nearly Yukio's age to carry on the family affairs.

In 1938 he applied to enroll in the War Academy of both the Imperial Navy and the ground forces. He was accepted to both; he chose the Japanese Naval Academy at Etajima. During this time, his father died and his mother closed the antiques shop and lived alone. In 1941, one month before the Pearl Harbor attack, Seki graduated and was ordered to the battleship Fusō. In June of the same year, he was promoted to lieutenant. Soon he was transferred to the seaplane carrier Chitose.

== Service in World War II ==
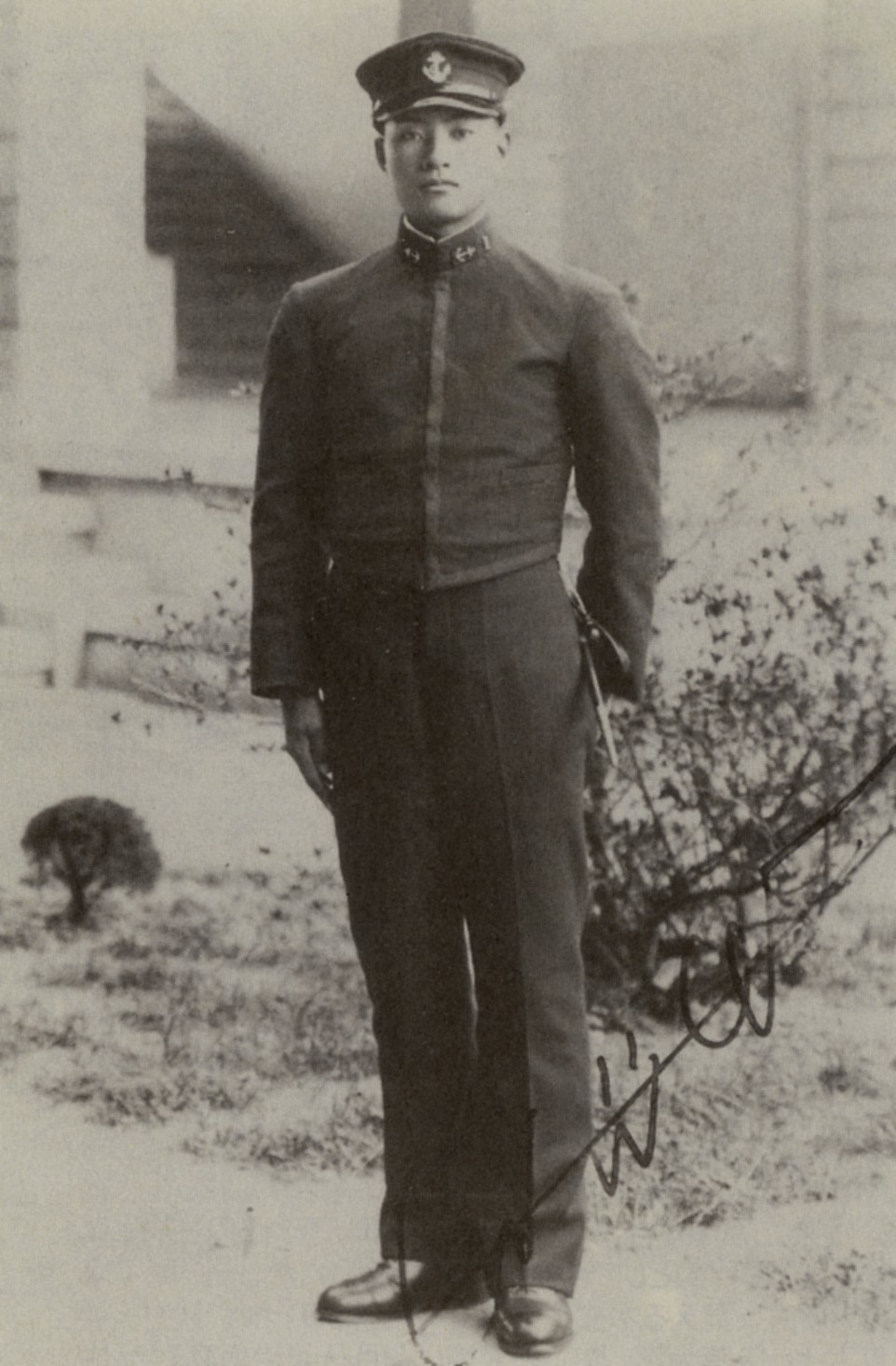
Yukio Seki in 1939

Seki saw several naval actions, and participated in a minor role in the Battle of Midway as his ship, Chitose, belonged to the second wave of Japanese ships.

In 1942, Seki returned to Japan and enrolled in the Naval flying academy at Kasumigaura, Ibaraki. After basic training, he was transferred to Usa in Ōita Prefecture, to be trained as a dive bomber operating from carriers. In January 1944, he became an instructor at Kasumigaura. Seki became friends with the Watanabe family living in Kamakura and fell in love with their daughter Mariko. Once when he was out drinking with his colleagues, one of them suggested that all of them should get married on the same day. They all agreed. The same weekend, Seki went to Kamakura and proposed to Mariko while her mother was present. Mariko accepted, and they were married May 31, 1944. Seki's mother Sekae was the only relative from his side to take part in the wedding. After the wedding, she lived with the young couple for a month and then left saying, "Young couples need some time alone". Soon after, they moved into a house close to the flying academy.

In September 1944, Seki was transferred to Tainan, a city in Taiwan. He had to leave his wife behind because Tainan was not safe enough for them to go together. Mariko followed Seki to Yokohama to say goodbye to him. Three weeks after he had arrived in Tainan, he was transferred again, this time to the 201st Flotilla in the Philippines as leader of the 301st fighter unit. Their base was originally in Nichols Field south of Manila, but was later moved to Clark Field in Mabalacat, away from increasing attacks by the Americans.

During this time, Vice Admiral Takijirō Ōnishi had been making plans for the first kamikaze attack, and Lieutenant Seki was given the opportunity by group commander Asaichi Tamai to lead a special attack squadron that would end in the loss of his own life. Seki is said to have closed his eyes, lowered his head and thought for ten seconds, before saying to Tamai, "Please do appoint me to the post." Seki thereby became the leader of the squadron "Shikishima", which conducted the first official kamikaze attack, and the first to sink an enemy ship. Four times, his group returned to base in aborted sorties.

=== The kamikaze attack on Taffy 3 ===
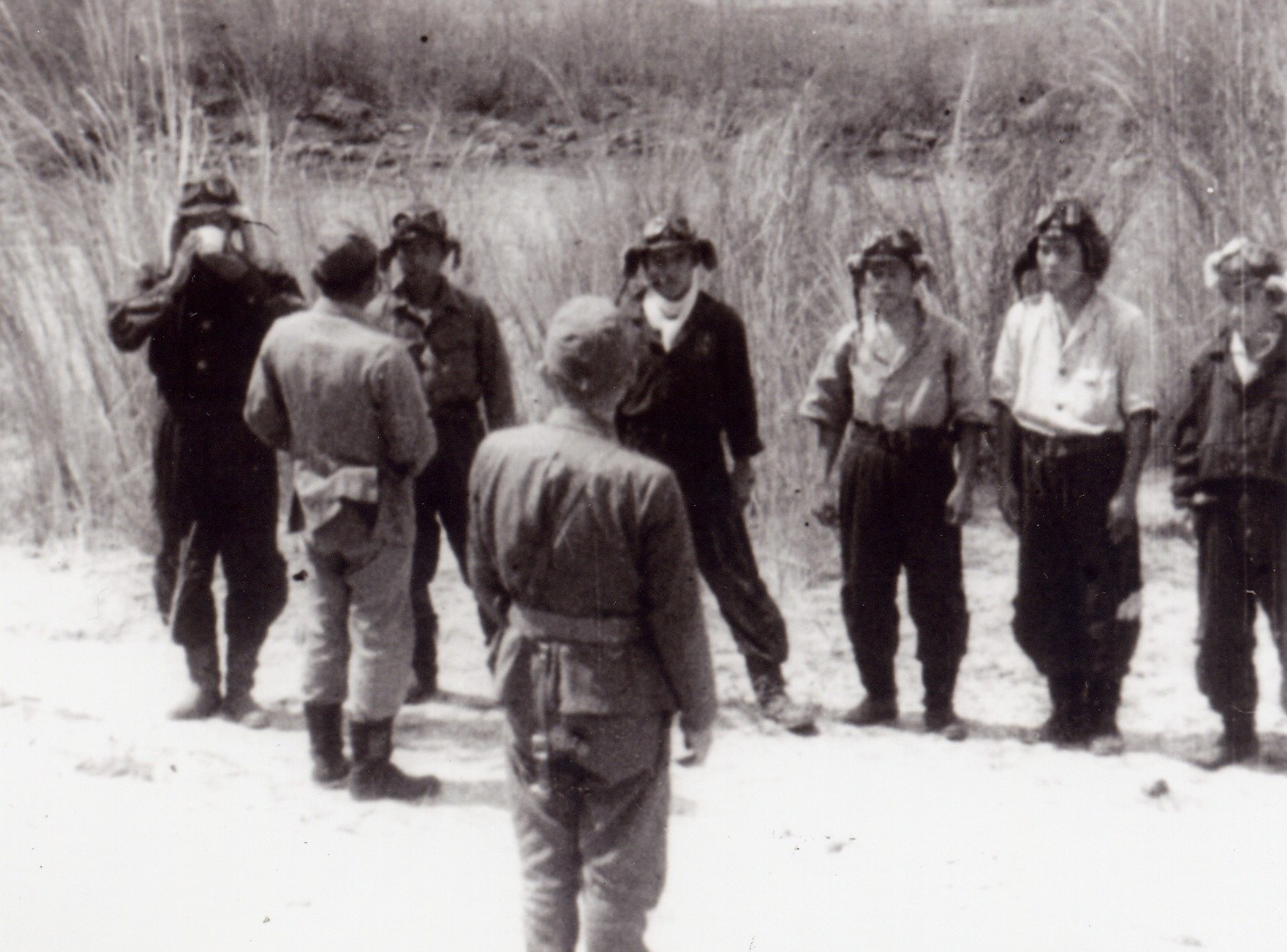
The men of the first kamikaze unit to make an attack on a US ship are offered a ceremonial toast of water as a farewell. Yukio Seki, the leader of the unit, is shown with a cup in his hands, and Vice Admiral Takijirō Ōnishi, who organized the first kamikaze unit, is in the middle of the photo facing the five men of the Shikishima Unit. The man offering the cup is likely Seki's officer, Asaichi Tamai

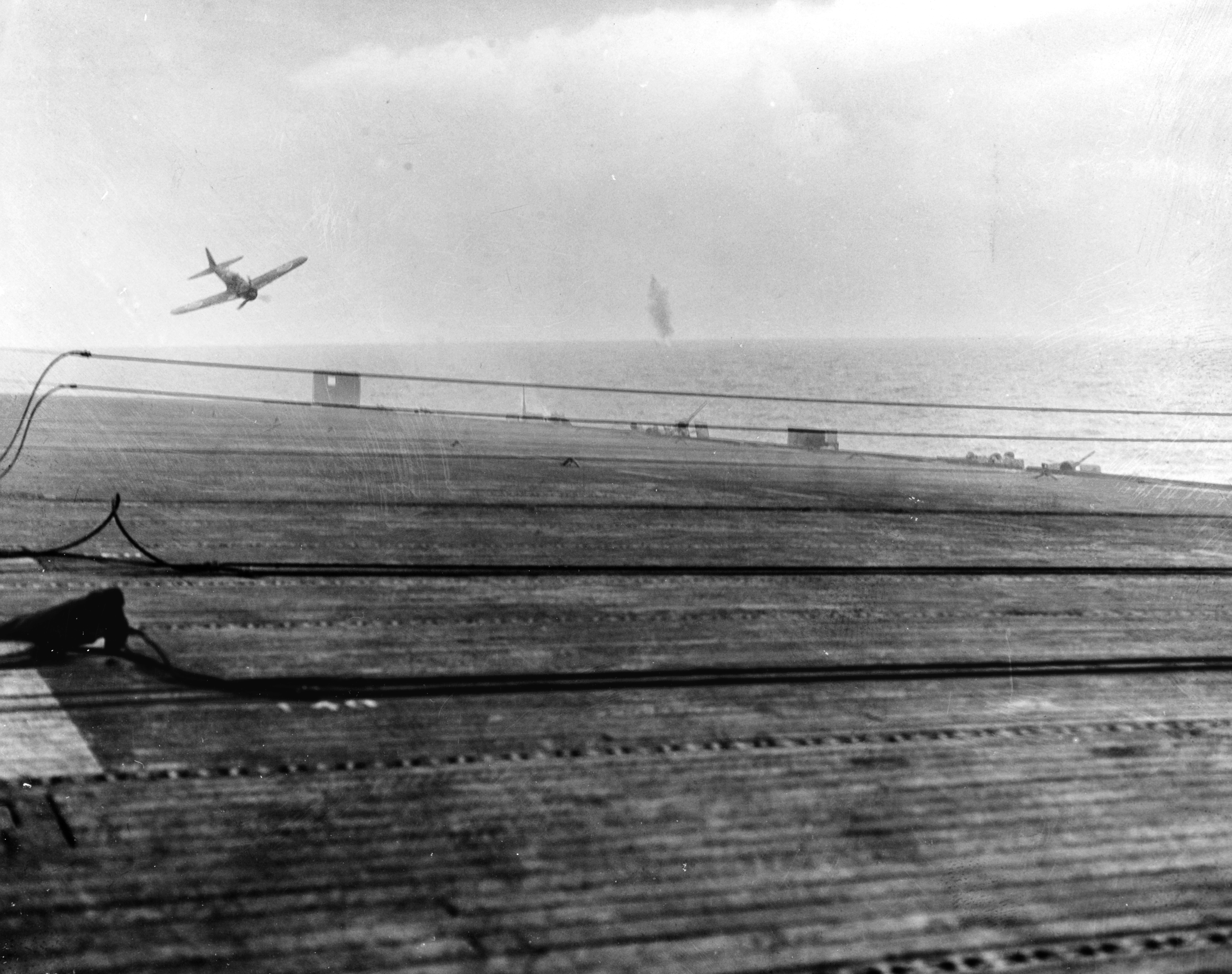
Near miss on USS White Plains.

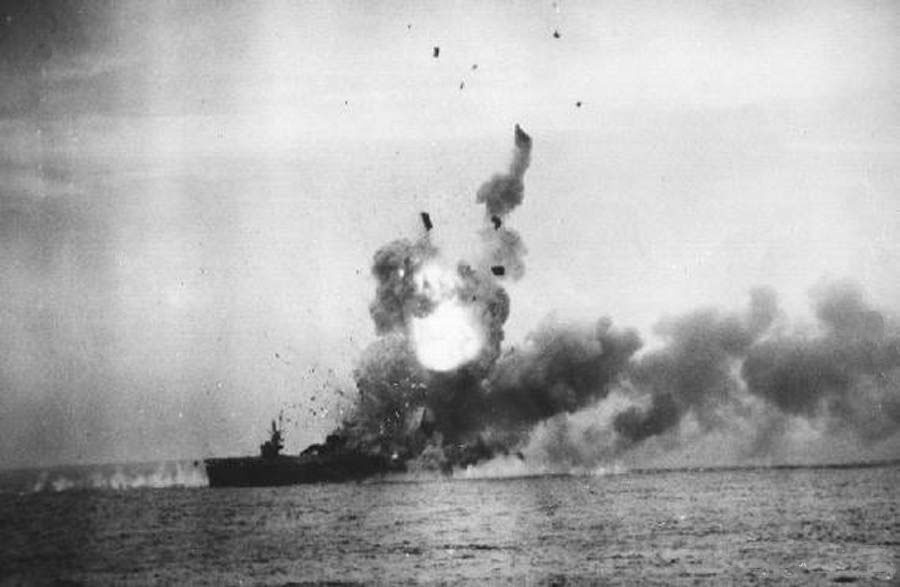
St. Lo's magazine detonates after Seki's attack

On October 25, 1944, Lt. Seki's squadron of five kamikaze A6M2 Model 21 Zeros, each carrying a 250 kg (550-pound) bomb, took off with an escort of 4 A6M5's flown by legendary ace Hiroyoshi Nishizawa, Misao Sugawa, Shingo Honda and Ryoji Baba. Their target was Vice Admiral Clifton Sprague's "Taffy 3" task force during their desperate defense of the landings in the Battle of Leyte Gulf, having only a short while earlier survived an attack by the Imperial Japanese Navy Center Force led by Admiral Takeo Kurita that included the IJN flagship Yamato in the Battle off Samar before Kurita ordered the Center Force to return home after expending much of their ammunition meant for the Leyte landings against Taffy 3, only succeeding in sinking the escort carrier USS Gambier Bay, the destroyers USS Johnston and USS Hoel and destroyer escort USS Samuel B. Roberts before withdrawing. At 1050, Seki's squadron made their attack on four escort carriers of Taffy 3:

- USS White Plains (CVE-66): Two planes attacked. AA fire scored a hit on one attacker who changed course for St. Lo. The second plane was destroyed by AA fire just yards astern of White Plains. White Plains was not hit, but debris was scattered on the aft deck, causing 11 minor injuries.
- USS Kalinin Bay (CVE-68): Four diving planes attacked from astern. Two planes were shot down by AA fire. One crashed into the port side of the flight deck, damaging it badly. The other hit the aft port stack, destroying it.
- USS Kitkun Bay (CVE-71): The port catwalk was clipped and the aircraft exploded off the port side, causing one death and no significant damage.
- USS St. Lo (CVE-63): The plane which veered off from White Plains approached St. Lo. Her action report states: "Approaching the ramp at very high speed, the 'Zeke 52' crossed over the aft end of the ship at less than fifty feet. He appeared to push over sufficiently to hit the deck at about the 'number 5 wire', fifteen feet to the port side of the center line. A tremendous crash followed quickly followed by an explosion as one or both of the enemy's bombs exploded. The aircraft continued up the deck leaving fragments strewed about and its remnants went over the bow." At first, the damage appeared minor. "There was a hole in the flight deck with smoldering edges which sprang into flame. Hoses were immediately run out from both sides of the flight deck and water started on the fire ... smoke soon appeared on both sides of the ship, evidently coming from the hangar. Within one to one and one-half minutes an explosion occurred on the hangar deck, which puffed smoke and flame through the hole in the deck and bulged the flight deck near and aft of the hole. This was followed in a matter of seconds by a much more violent explosion, which rolled back a part of the flight deck bursting through aft of the original hole. The next heavy explosion tore out more of the flight deck and also blew the forward elevator out of its shaft." The magazine had detonated, and St. Lo was gone in half an hour.

According to US Navy reports, there were no other kamikaze hits on US ships that day, although there was a "suicide" near miss on Kitkun Bay which was destroyed by AA fire from Kitkun Bay. Since this was at 1120 – nearly one half-hour after Seki's attack – and all five of Seki's kamikazes were apparently expended and the airplane was a Yokosuka D4Y dive bomber, it is unlikely it was part of Seki's group.

== Discrepancies ==
It is debated whether Seki's plane sank St. Lo. Nishizawa survived the attack and made his report stating that Seki's plane glanced off the deck of a carrier but that the bomb did not explode. His description on this point closely matches the attack on St. Lo as reported by her captain. A second plane did score a hit on the same carrier that Seki attacked, and that plane's bomb did explode. The only carrier with two hits was Kalinin Bay. However, the description is sharply different, since there was an immediate visibly large explosion following the first hit on Kalinin Bay, and no portions of the plane were seen to go over the bow. So Nishizawa's description of Seki's hit most closely matches that on St. Lo. A posting on an earlier USS St. Lo survivor site showed a photo purported to be of the engine serial number plate of the plane which sank the ship found on the deck by a sailor about to abandon ship. It was stated that the serial number was later traced back through Japanese authorities to the plane and the pilot who flew it that day, Lt. Seki.

Prior to Seki's mission, Masashi Onoda, a Dōmei war correspondent, interviewed Yukio Seki and quotes him disparaging suicide attacks:

Japan's future is bleak if it is forced to kill one of its best pilots. I am not going on this mission for the Emperor or for the Empire ... I am going because I was ordered to!

He also gave insight into his thinking on how the carrier force should be attacked:

"If they would let me, I could drop a 500 kilogram bomb on the flight deck of a carrier without going in for body-crashing and still make my way back." During his flight, his commanders heard him say "It is better to die, rather than to live as a coward."

Seki's full quote from the Onoda interview is as follows:

Press member, Japan is over. Killing a good pilot like me. I am confident that I can hit the 50-ban (500kg bomb) on the flight deck of an enemy aircraft carrier without committing suicide attack. I'm not going for His Majesty the Emperor or for the Japanese Empire. I'm going for my beloved KA (Imperial Japanese Navy jargon, wife). It is unavoidable if there is an order. If Japan loses, KA may be raped by Ame-ko (American soldiers). I'm dying to protect her. Die for a loved one. How is it? Would be brilliant.

His final letters were addressed to his mother, wife and parents of his wife before departing for this final mission.

== See also ==
- Kamikaze
