= Ryōji Uehara =

Flight captain of the Imperial Japanese Army (1922–1945)

- 上原 良司
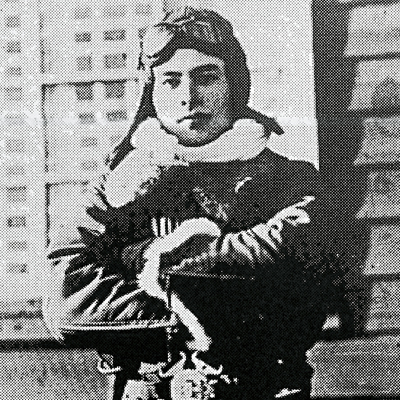
- Born: 27 September 1922; Ikeda, Nagano, Japan
- Died: 11 May 1945 (aged 22); Near Kadena, Okinawa, Japan
- Education: Keio University
- Military career
- Allegiance: Empire of Japan
- Branch: Imperial Japanese Army
- Service years: 1942–1945
- Rank: Flight captain
- Units: IJA 50th Regiment; 56th Shinmu Squadron
- Conflicts: World War II; Battle of Okinawa †

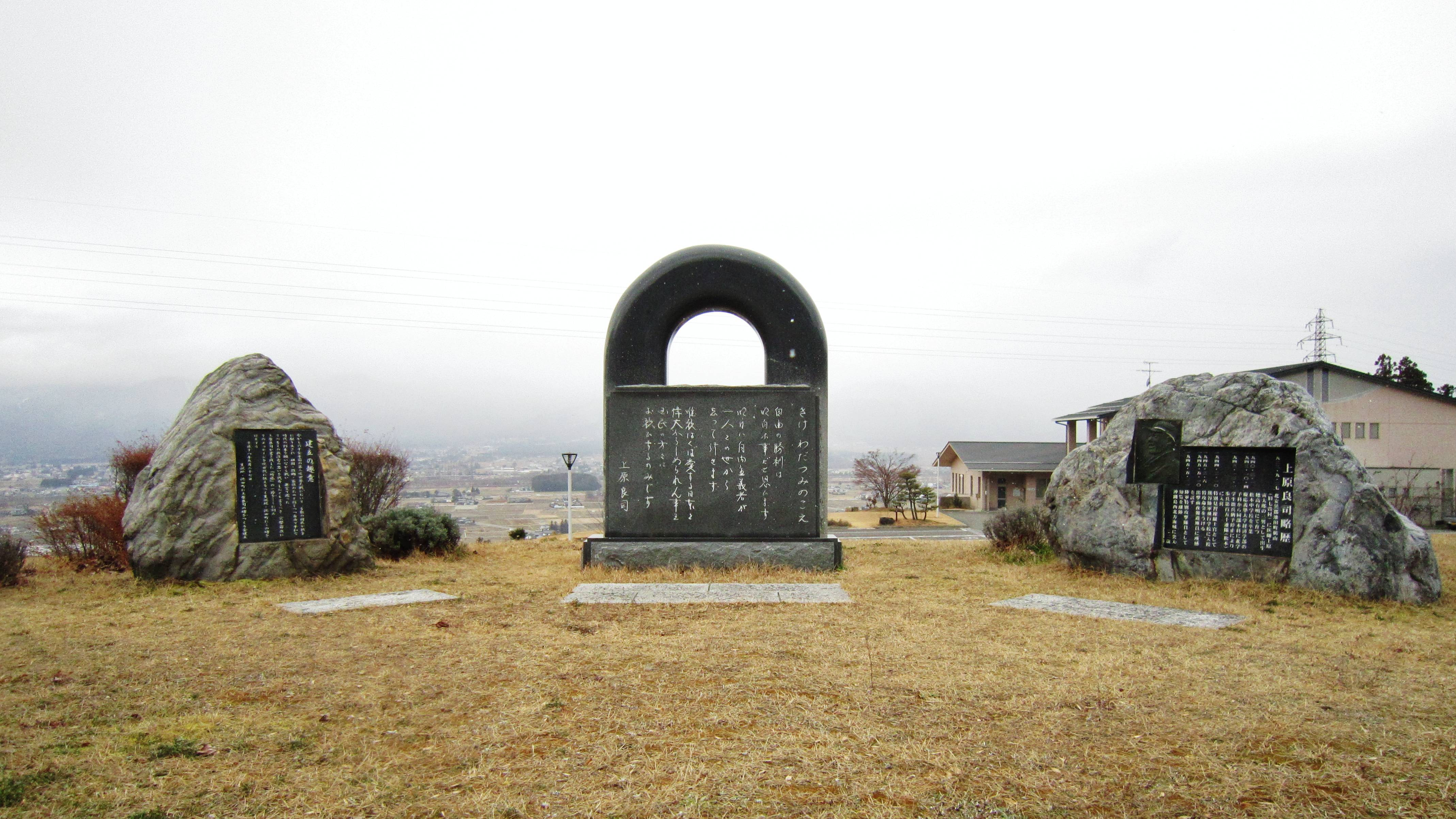
Uehara Ryoji memorial in Ikeda, Nagano

Ryōji Uehara (上原 良司, Uehara Ryōji; 27 September 1922 – 11 May 1945) was a flight captain of the Imperial Japanese Army and was killed in action as a kamikaze pilot.

Uehara was born in what is now the town of Ikeda, Nagano. He entered the Department of Economics at Keio University in 1942 and joined the IJA 50th Regiment in Matsumoto, Nagano Prefecture, later that same year. He was a member of the 56th Shinmu Squadron (第56振武隊) of the IJA Air Corps when he carried out his final mission against the US carrier fleet near Kadena, Okinawa Prefecture on 11 May 1945. He was 22 years old.

His letter, written to his parents the night before his final mission, was published after the war and it is still regarded as a masterpiece of wartime literary works in Japan.

== The Last Letter ==
I feel deeply honoured and privileged to have been chosen to become a member of the Army’s “Special Assault Unit,” which embodies the glory of Japan. Having read logic and philosophy through my somewhat extended student life, I am sure that, based upon the idea of reason, triumph of liberty is inevitable to me, although I might sound like a liberalist. As stated by Croce in Italy, it is a universal truth that it is absolutely impossible to exterminate freedom, which is a fundamental human nature, and it will eventually win even though it seems to be temporarily oppressed.

It is a clear fact that authoritarian and totalitarian regimes may sporadically prosper, but they ultimately will perish. We can see the truth of that in the Axis governments. As manifested by the defeat of Italy under Fascism, not to mention Germany under Nazism, authoritarian governments are disappearing one after the other, crumbling like buildings without a foundation.

I believe that the universality of truth will eternally and permanently prove the greatness of liberty as is now being verified by reality and just as history has shown in the past. I will be more than delighted to find that my belief has been proven right even though that turns out to be a disaster for our nation. The current struggle, whatever it is, stems from ideology; and the result of a struggle can readily be predicted by the belief systems upon which the struggle is fought.

The ambition of making my beloved Japan become as mighty an empire as Great Britain has faded away. If the leading positions in Japan had been held by those who truly love Japan, my country would not have been driven into the situation it faces today. I have been dreaming of the Japanese people proud of themselves no matter where one may be in the world.

What a friend of mine once said is true: a pilot of the Special Assault Unit is merely a machine. He just steers the apparatus. He is only a molecule within a magnet that sticks fast to an enemy aircraft carrier, possessing neither personality nor emotions.

If one thinks about it rationally, this act is incomprehensible and, to try to put it in a plain expression, these pilots are, as they say, simply suicidal. Since I am nothing more than a machine, I have no right to put my case forward. However, I only wish that the Japan that I dearly love will someday be made truly great by my fellow citizens.

In such an emotional state, my death may probably lead to nothing. Nonetheless, as I stated at the outset, I feel very honoured to have been chosen to be a member of the Special Assault Unit. It is true that, once inside an aircraft, I am mere hardware, but once disembarked, I do have emotions and passion as I am also a human. When the woman for whom I cared so dearly passed away, I emotionally died with her. The idea that she waits for me in Heaven, where we will be reunited, makes death not particularly frightening for me, since it happens only on my way to Heaven.

Tomorrow is the day of the assault. My idea is too highly extreme to be made public, but I just wanted to express the true feelings inside me, so please forgive me for my disoriented thoughts. Another liberalist will depart from this earth tomorrow. Although he may appear forlorn, he is in fact very content.

Once again, please forgive my selfish ranting.

== Aftermath ==
Among Uehara's personal effects was a book on philosophy written by Benedetto Croce. In the book there were markings here and there. When one strings together the characters so marked, it reads as follows:

Goodbye, my beloved Kyoko-chan.
I loved you so much;
but even then you were already engaged,
so it was very painful for me.
Thinking only of your happiness,
I suppressed the urge to whisper into your ear
that I loved you. I love you still.
