= List of ships damaged by kamikaze attack =

A number of Allied ships were damaged by Japanese suicide air attacks during World War II. Many of these attacks were by the kamikaze (officially Shinpū Tokubetsu Kōgekitai, "Divine Wind Special Attack Unit"), using pilot-guided explosive missiles, purpose-built or converted from conventional aircraft, by the Empire of Japan against Allied naval vessels in the closing stages of the Pacific campaign of the war, although several ships were also sunk or damaged in the earlier part of the war by intentional crashes of conventional Japanese war planes.

- USS Aaron Ward (DM-34) (May 1945)
- USS Achernar (AKA-53) (April 1945)
- USS Achilles (ARL-41)
- USS Alpine (APA-92)
- USS Ammen (DD-527)
- USS Anthony (DD-515)
- USS Apache (ATF-67)
- HMAS Arunta (I30)
- HMAS Australia (D84)
- USS Bache (DD-470)
- USS Baham
- USS Barry (DD-248)
- USS Belknap (DD-251)
- USS Belleau Wood (CVL-24)
- USS Bennett (DD-473)
- USS Birmingham (CL-62)
- USS Bowers (DE-637)
- USS Borie (DD-704)
- USS Braine (DD-630)
- USS Bright (DE-747)
- USS Brooks (DD-232)
- USS Bryant (DD-665)
- USS Bullard (DD-660)
- USS Bunker Hill (CV-17)
- USS Butler (DD-636)
- USS Cabot (CVL-28)
- USS Caldwell (DD-605)
- USS California (BB-44)
- USS Callaway (APA-35)
- USS Cassin Young (DD-793)
- USS Champion (AM-314)
- USS Chase (DE-158)
- USS Claxton (DD-571)
- USS Colorado (BB-45)
- USS Columbia (CL-56)
- USS Comfort (AH-6)
- USS Cowell (DD-547)
- USS Daly (DD-519)
- USS Devilfish (SS-292)
- USS Dickerson (DD-157)
- USS Dorsey (DD-117)
- USS Douglas H. Fox (DD-779)
- USS DuPage (APA-41)
- USS England (DE-635)
- USS Enterprise (CV-6)
- USS Essex (CV-9)
- USS Evans (DD-552)
- USS Facility (AM-233)
- HMS Formidable (67)
- USS Forrest (DD-461)
- USS Franklin (CV-13)
- USS Gansevoort (DD-608)
- USS Gilligan (DE-508)
- USS Gregory (DD-802)
- USS Guest (DD-472)
- USS Gwin (DM-33)
- USS Haggard (DD-555)
- USS Halloran (DE-305)
- USS Hambleton (DD-455)
- USS Hancock (CV-19)
- USS Hank (DD-702)
- USS Haraden (DD-585)
- USS Harding (DD-625)
- USS Haynsworth (DD-700)
- USS Hazelwood (DD-531)
- USS Henrico (APA-45)
- USS Hinsdale (APA-120)
- USS Hobson (DD-464)
- USS Hodges (DE-231)
- USS Hopkins (DD-249)
- USS Hornet (CV-8) 1942 Battle of Santa Cruz in the first kamikaze attack
- HMS Howe (32)
- USS Howorth (DD-592)
- USS Hughes (DD-410)
- USS Hunt (DD-674)
- USS Hyman (DD-732)
- HMS Indefatigable (R10)
- USS Ingraham (DD-694)
- USS Intrepid (CV-11)
- USS Isherwood (DD-520)
- USS J. William Ditter (DM-31)
- USS Kadashan Bay (CVE-76)
- USS Kalinin Bay (CVE-68)
- USS Keokuk (CMc-6)
- USS Kidd (DD-661)
- USS Kimberly (DD-521)
- USS Kitkun Bay (CVE-71)
- SS Kyle V. Johnson, merchant marine vessel attacked during the Invasion of Lingayen Gulf
- USS La Grange (APA-124)
- USS Laffey (DD-724)
- USS Lamson (DD-367)
- USS Leutze (DD-481)
- USS Lexington (CV-16)
- USS Liddle (DE-206)
- USS Lindsey (DM-32)
- USS Long (DD-209/DMS-12)
- USS Louisville (CA-28)
- USS Loy (DE-160)
- USS LSM(R)-189
- USS LST-884
- USS Mahnomen County (LST-912)
- USS Manila Bay (CVE-61)
- SS Marcus Daly
- USS Marcus Island (CVE-77)
- USS Maryland (BB-46)
- USS Mississippi (BB-41)
- USS Missouri (BB-63)
- USS Montpelier (CL-57)
- USS Morris (DD-417)
- USS Mullany (DD-528)
- USS Nashville (CL-43)
- USS Natoma Bay (CVE-62)
- USS Nevada (BB-36)
- USS New Mexico (BB-40)
- USS New York (BB-34)
- USS Newcomb (DD-586)
- USS O'Neill (DE-188)
- USS Orestes (AGP-10)
- USS Pathfinder (AGS-1)
- USS Pinkney (APH-2)
- USS Prichett (DD-561)
- USS Purdy (DD-734)
- USS Rall (DE-304)
- USS Ralph Talbot (DD-390)
- USS Randolph (CV-15)
- USS Ransom (AM-283)
- USS Rathburne (DD-113)
- USS Rednour (APD-102)
- USS Reno (CL-96)
- USS Riddle (DE-185)
- USS Rodman (DD-456/DMS-21)
- USS Roper (DD-147)
- USS Salamaua (CVE-96)
- USS Samuel S. Miles (DE-183)
- USS Sandoval (APA-194)
- USS Sangamon (CVE-26)
- USS Santee (CVE-29)
- USS Savo Island (CVE-78)
- USS Sederstrom (DE-31)
- USS Shubrick (DD-639)
- USS Sims (DE-154)
- USS Smith (DD-378) 1942 Battle of Santa Cruz in the first kamikaze attack
- USS Sonoma (AT-12)
- USS Southard (DD-207)
- USS Spectacle (AM-305)
- USS St. George (AV-16)
- USS St. Lo (CVE-63) 1944 Battle of Leyte Gulf, the first major warship sunk by a kamikaze attack
- USS St. Louis (CL-49)
- USS Stafford (DE-411)
- USS Suwannee (CVE-27)
- USS Taluga (AO-62)
- USS Telfair (APA-210)
- USS Tennessee (BB-43)
- USS Terror (CM-5)
- USS Thatcher (DD-514)
- USS Ticonderoga (CV-14)
- USS Twiggs (DD-591)
- USS Tyrrell (AKA-80)
- HMS Venerable (R63)
- HMS Vestal (J215)
- HMS Victorious (R38)
- USS Wadsworth (DD-516)
- USS Walke (DD-723)
- USS Wesson (DE-184)
- USS White Plains (CVE-66)
- USS Whitehurst (DE-634)
- USS William D. Porter (DD-579)
- USS Wilson (DD-408)
- USS Witter (DE-636)
- USS Zeilin (APA-3)
