= Asaichi Tamai =

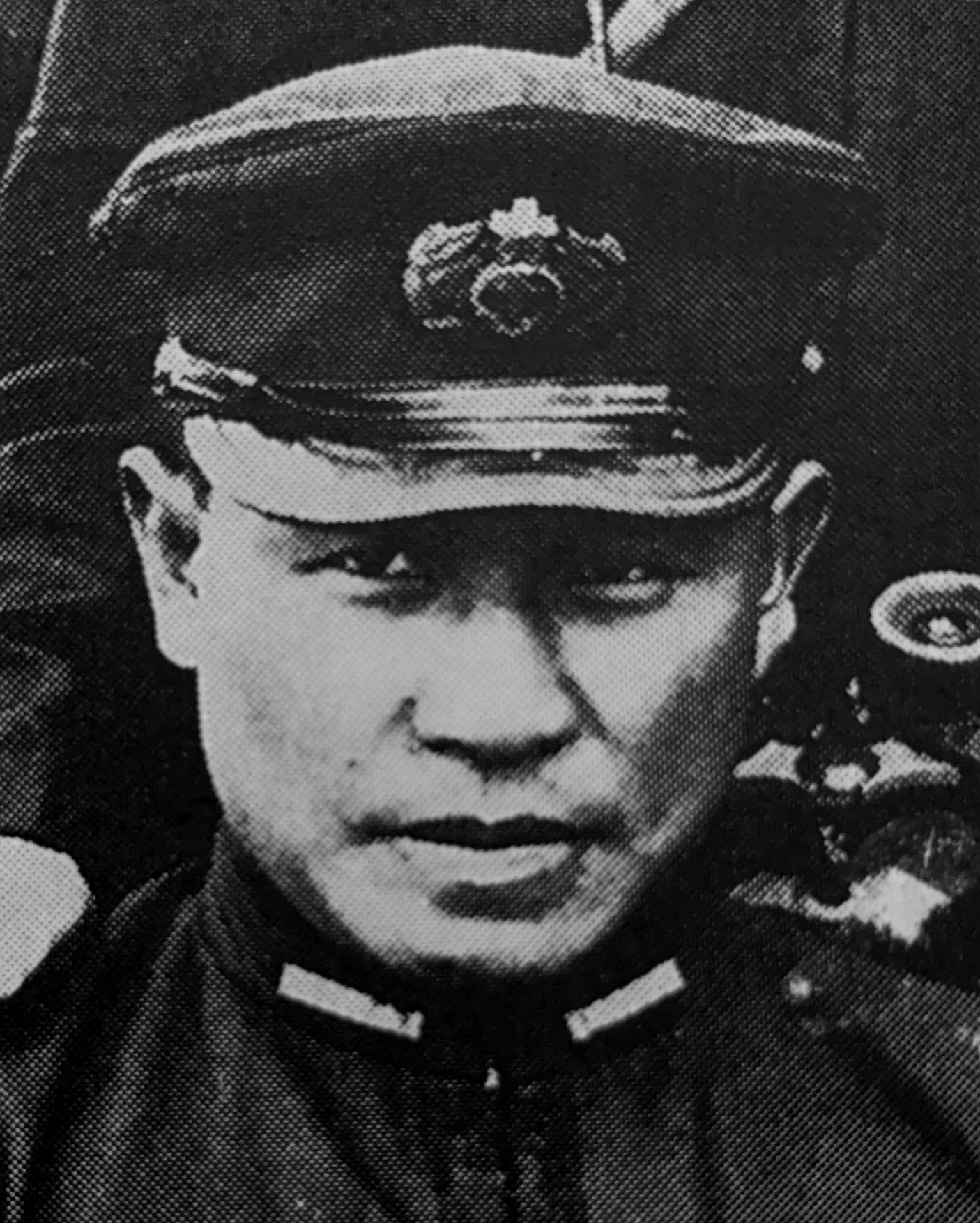
Asaichi Tamai

Asaichi Tamai (玉井 浅一; December 25, 1902 – December 10, 1964) was a captain in the Imperial Japanese Navy during World War II.

== Early life ==
Tamai was born in the Ehime Prefecture, attended Matsuyama Middle School in Matsuyama and graduated in 1924. In December 1925 he was appointed lieutenant in the Japanese navy. He cleared pilot licensing and certification in November 1929.

== See also ==
- Yukio Seki
