= Kalinin =

Kalinin may refer to:

- Mikhail Kalinin (1875–1946), Bolshevik revolutionary and Soviet functionary after whom all other entries are named
- Kalinin (surname)

== Places ==
- Kalinin, former name of Noramarg, Armenia
- Kalinin, former name of Tashir, Armenia
- Kalinin, former name of Burunqovaq, Azerbaijan
- Kaliningrad Oblast, a federal subject and exclave of Russia located on the coast of the Baltic Sea.
  - Kaliningrad, the largest city and administrative center of the Kaliningrad Oblast
- Kalinin, Russia, several inhabited localities in Russia
- Kalinin, former name of Tver, Russia
- Kalinin, Chuy, a village in Jayyl District, Chuy Region, Kyrgyzstan
- Kalinin, Naryn, a village in At-Bashy District, Naryn Region, Kyrgyzstan
- Kalinin, Osh, a village in Kara-Suu District, Osh Region, Kyrgyzstan
- Poselok Imeni Kalinina, a town in Armenia
- Kalinin, Bokhtar District, a town in Tajikistan
- Kalinin, Hamadoni District, a town in Tajikistan
- Kalinin, former name of Boldumsaz, Turkmenistan
- Kalinin, former name of Eshonguzar, Uzbekistan

== Aircraft and ships ==
- Kalinin, original name under which the Kirov class Russian battlecruiser Admiral Nakhimov was commissioned
- Soviet cruiser Kalinin
- Aleksandrov-Kalinin AK-1, Soviet prototype airliner
- Kalinin K-4, Soviet Union airliner
- Kalinin K-5, Soviet Union airliner
- Kalinin K-7, an early experimental Soviet aircraft
- Kalinin K-12, projected twin engine bomber aircraft
- Kalinin K-15, an early experimental Soviet aircraft
- USS Kalinin Bay (CVE-68), a US Navy ship from World War II

== Other uses ==
- Kalinin Front, Red Army Group formation
- Kalinin coal mine in Donetsk Oblast, Ukraine
- Kalinin Nuclear Power Plant near Udomlya, Tver Oblast, Russian
- Kalinin Machine-Building Plant near Yekaterinburg, Russia
- 2699 Kalinin, an asteroid

== See also ==
- Kalininsky (disambiguation)
- Kaliningrad (disambiguation)
- Kaliningradsky (disambiguation)
- Kalininsk (disambiguation)
