= USS White Plains (CVE-66) =

Casablanca-class escort carrier of the US Navy

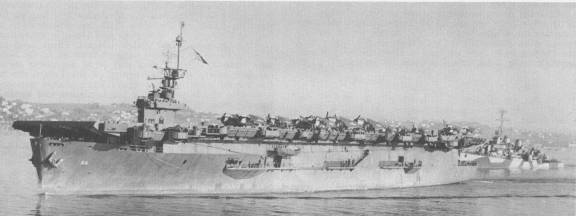
- USS White Plains at San Diego, 8 March 1944

History

United States
- Name: USS White Plains
- Namesake: Battle of White Plains
- Builder: Kaiser Shipyards
- Laid down: 11 February 1943
- Launched: 27 September 1943
- Commissioned: 15 November 1943
- Decommissioned: 10 July 1946
- Stricken: 1 July 1958
- Fate: Damaged by an 18.1 inch shell during the Battle off Samar used as an aircraft ferry and later sold for scrap on 29 July 1958

General characteristics
- Class & type: Casablanca-class escort carrier
- Displacement: 10,400 tons
- Length: 512 ft 3 in (156.13 m) overall
- Beam: 65 ft 2 in (19.86 m), 108 ft (33 m) maximum width
- Draft: 22 ft 6 in (6.86 m)
- Propulsion: 2 × 5-cylinder reciprocating Skinner Uniflow engines; 4 × 285 psi boilers; 2 shafts; 9,000 shp
- Speed: 19.3 knots (35.7 km/h)
- Range: 10,240 nmi (18,960 km) @ 15 kn (28 km/h)
- Complement: Total:910-916 officers and men; Embarked Squadron:50-56; Ship's Crew:860
- Armament: 1 × 5 in (127 mm)/38 cal dual purpose gun, 12 × Bofors 40 mm guns (6×2), 20 × Oerlikon 20 mm cannons (20×1)
- Aircraft carried: 24

Service record
- Part of: United States Pacific Fleet (1943–1946), Atlantic Reserve Fleet (1946–1958)
- Operations: Battle of Saipan, Battle of Leyte Gulf, Operation Magic Carpet
- Awards: Presidential Unit Citation; 5 Battle stars

USS White Plains (CVE-66) was a Casablanca-class escort carrier of the United States Navy. She was named after the 1776 Battle of White Plains.

She was laid down on 11 February 1943 at Vancouver, Washington, by the Kaiser Shipbuilding Company, Inc., under a Maritime Commission contract (MC hull 1103) as Elbour Bay (ACV-66); renamed White Plains on 3 April 1943; redesignated CVE-66 on 15 July 1943; launched on 27 September 1943; sponsored by Mrs. Marc A. Mitscher; delivered to the Navy on 15 November 1943 at Astoria, Oregon; and commissioned that same day, Captain Oscar A. Weller in command.

== Design and description ==
A side profile of the design of Thetis Bay.

White Plains was a Casablanca-class escort carrier, the most numerous type of aircraft carriers ever built. Built to stem heavy losses during the Battle of the Atlantic, they came into service in late 1943, by which time the U-boat threat was already in retreat. Although some did see service in the Atlantic, the majority were utilized in the Pacific, ferrying aircraft, providing logistics support, and conducting close air support for the island-hopping campaigns. The Casablanca-class carriers were built on the standardized Type S4-S2-BB3 hull, a lengthened variant of the Doyen-class hull, and specifically designed to be mass-produced using welded prefabricated sections. This allowed them to be produced at unprecedented speeds: the final ship of her class, Munda, was delivered to the Navy just 101 days after the laying of her keel.

White Plains was 512 ft 3 in (156.13 m) long overall (490 ft (150 m) at the waterline), had a beam of 65 ft 2 in (19.86 m), and a draft of 20 ft 9 in (6.32 m). She displaced 8,188 long tons (8,319 t) standard, which increased to 10,902 long tons (11,077 t) with a full load. To carry out flight operations, the ship had a 257 ft (78 m) hangar deck and a 474 ft (144 m) flight deck. Her compact size necessitated the installation of an aircraft catapult at her bow, and there were two aircraft elevators to facilitate movement of aircraft between the flight and hangar deck: one each fore and aft.

She was powered by four Babcock & Wilcox Express D boilers that raised 285 psi (1,970 kPa) of steam at 577 °F (303 °C). The steam generated by these boilers fed two Skinner Unaflow reciprocating steam engines, delivering 9,000 hp (6,700 kW) to two propeller shafts. This allowed her to reach speeds of 19 kn (35 km/h; 22 mph), with a cruising range of 10,240 nmi (18,960 km; 11,780 mi) at 15 kn (28 km/h; 17 mph). For armament, one 5 in (127 mm)/38 caliber dual-purpose gun was mounted on the stern. Additional anti-aircraft defense was provided by eight Bofors 40 mm (1.57 in) anti-aircraft guns in single mounts and twelve Oerlikon 20 mm (0.79 in) cannons mounted around the perimeter of the deck. By 1945, Casablanca-class carriers had been modified to carry twenty Oerlikon cannons and sixteen Bofors guns; the doubling of the latter was accomplished by putting them into twin mounts. Sensors onboard consisted of a SG surface-search radar and a SK air-search radar.

Although Casablanca-class escort carriers were intended to function with a crew of 860 and an embarked squadron of 50 to 56, the exigencies of wartime often necessitated the inflation of the crew count. They were designed to operate with 27 aircraft, but the hangar deck could accommodate much more during transport or training missions.

== Service history ==
=== World War II ===
The USS White Plains completed her outfitting at Astoria, Oregon, on 4 December 1943, and then she began shakedown training on 8 December. At the conclusion of her initial cruise, the warship entered San Diego on 21 December. On 30 December, she returned to sea, bound for the Gilbert Islands. She arrived at Tarawa Atoll on 11 January 1944 and unloaded the aircraft she had transported. On 17 January, the ship headed back to Oahu, arriving in Pearl Harbor six days later. Following a four-day turnaround period, the White Plains again set course for the Central Pacific to provide aircraft logistics support for the Marshall Islands operation. By the time she reached Tarawa on 3 February, the undefended Majuro Atoll had been occupied, and the Japanese garrison at Kwajalein Atoll had been all but subdued. On the next day, she got underway for Majuro where she arrived on 5 February. From there, the escort carrier moved on to Kwajalein for a brief visit before heading back to Hawaii. The White Plains stopped briefly at Oahu before continuing on toward the West Coast on 23 February. She arrived at Alameda, California, on San Francisco Bay on 3 March.

While off the West Coast, the White Plains conducted operational training for her own ship's company and carrier qualifications for three air squadrons. In April, she embarked her own permanently assigned air unit, Composite Squadron 4 (VC-4), composed of 16 Grumman F4F Wildcat fighters and 12 Grumman TBM Avenger torpedo planes. She departed the West Coast from the San Diego Naval Base on 24 April, and she arrived at Pearl Harbor on 1 May. During the next month, the White Plains conducted air operations and amphibious support training out of Pearl Harbor.

At the end of May, the White Plains steamed out of port in company with units of the Task Forces assembled to invade the Mariana Islands. The portion of the Fleet containing the White Plains sortied from Eniwetok Atoll, and during the voyage from there to the Marianas, her aircraft provided antisubmarine warfare patrols and part of the combat air patrol. During the assault on Saipan, her planes continued to cover the Fleet against submarine and air attack, strafed the beaches, and spotted shellfire for gunfire support ships. They helped repulse at least three major enemy air attacks. On 17 June, while helping to fight off those raids, her antiaircraft gunners earned their first definite kill. Later, VC-4 Avengers successfully torpedoed an enemy transport during a sweep of the island of Rota.

The USS White Plains departed the combat zone on 2 July but, after a week at Eniwetok, returned to the Marianas with her air squadron upgraded to a total of 28 aircraft. During her second tour of duty in the Marianas, the escort carrier supported the Tinian assault late in July. Her planes carried out sortie after sortie in support of the troops ashore and over the ships assembled, but the White Plains herself suffered no enemy attacks. Her heavy flight schedule proved grueling to air squadron and ship's company alike.

She completed her participation during the first week in August and departed the Marianas and headed for Espiritu Santo in the New Hebrides. She arrived in Segond Channel on 16 August and began preparations for the invasion of the Palau Islands. Those preparations included amphibious support training in the Solomon Islands. The White Plains and ten other aircraft carriers moved into the vicinity of the Palaus during the second week of September. Their planes provided a portion of the prelanding bombardment and support for the troops after the assault on 15 September. In contrast to the Marianas campaign and later operations, the Palaus, though extremely difficult on the troops ashore, brought little opposition to the ships in the waters surrounding the islands. No enemy air attacks developed because the Japanese were husbanding their aircraft for the defense of the Philippines, and as a result of Japan's new strategic concept of defense in depth at some distance from the beaches, few shore batteries were sited near enough to the coast to fire upon ships. On 21 September, the White Plains joined the forces detached from the Palau operation for the occupation of Ulithi Atoll, which to everyone's relief, was undefended.

==== Battle of Leyte Gulf ====
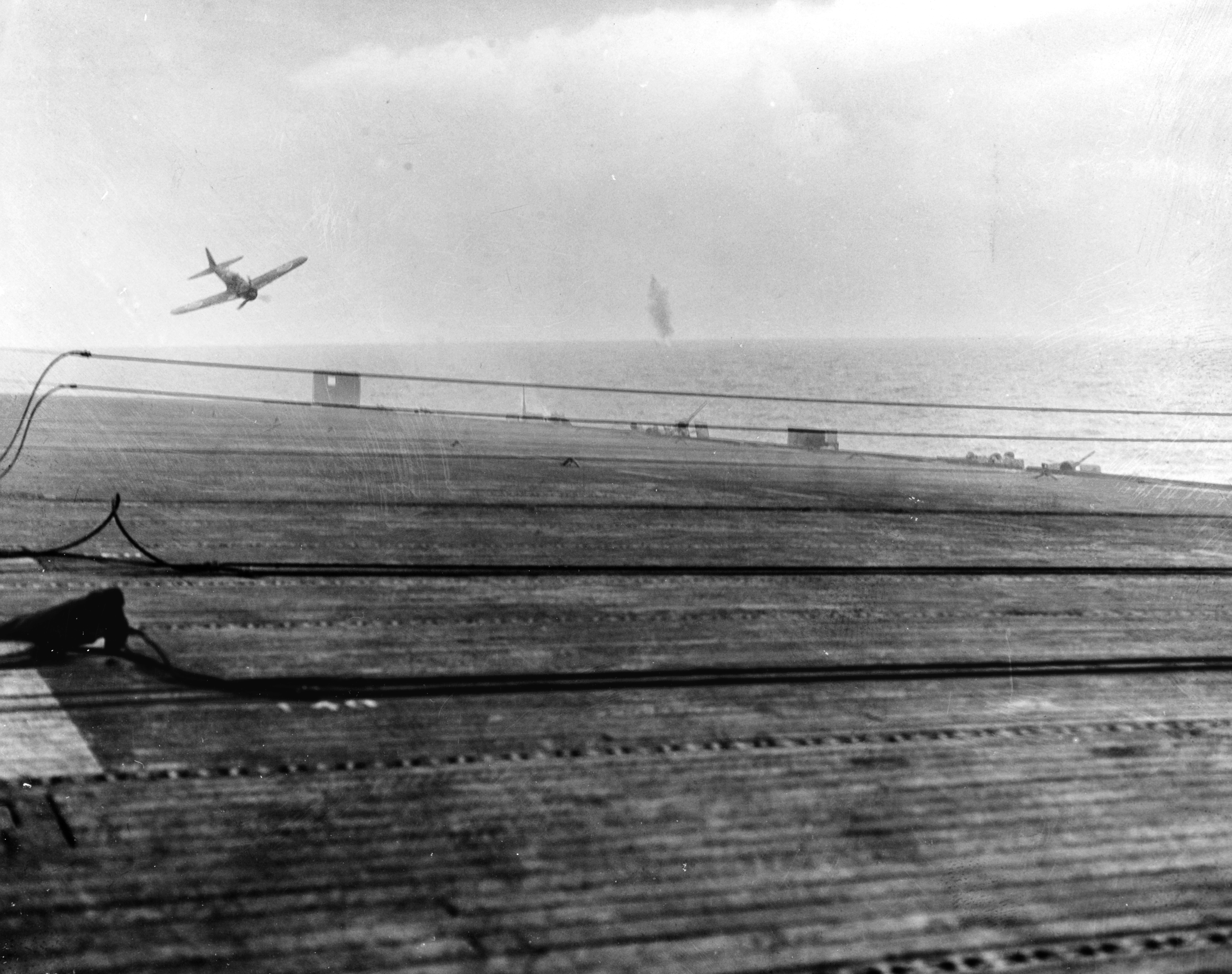
White Plains under attack by Tokkotai unit 25 October 1944. The aircraft in the photograph missed the carrier and struck the water.

In October 1944, after repairs at the naval base at Manus Island in the Admiralty Islands, USS White Plains headed for the invasion of the Philippines at Leyte. The initial assault went forward on 20 October. Aircraft from White Plains provided air support for the troops and ASW and combat air patrols for the ships assembled in Leyte Gulf. However, because of the strategic importance of the Philippines which lay athwart their lines of communication with the East Indies, the Japanese chose to oppose the landings with their surface fleet. They launched their surface counterattack in three distinct phases. While a decoy force of carriers under Admiral Jisaburō Ozawa moved south from Japan in an attempt to draw off Halsey's Third Fleet and the large carriers, the forces under Vice Admirals Shōji Nishimura and Kiyohide Shima attempted to force the Surigao Strait from the south, and Vice Admiral Takeo Kurita's Center Force tried to sneak through the Central Philippines and transit the hopefully unguarded San Bernardino Strait. The Center Force, by far the strongest of the enemy fleets involved, consisted of five battleships - including the huge superbattleships Yamato and Musashi - 11 heavy cruisers, two light cruisers, and 19 destroyers. By the time Kurita's Center Force cleared the San Bernardino Strait on 25 October, it had been reduced by four heavy cruisers and the battleship Musashi. Three heavy cruisers had fallen prey to American submarine attacks in the Palawan Passage on 23 October, and Musashi and Myōkō succumbed to Task Force 38's air attacks in the Sibuyan Sea on the following day. Musashi sank there, and Myōkō headed back to Brunei Bay, heavily damaged. In addition, on the night of 24 October and 25 October, Vice Admiral Oldendorf's old battleships in Leyte Gulf obliterated Nishimura's force and sent Shima's packing.

In the meantime, after Admiral Halsey received information indicating that a battered Center Force had begun retirement, Ozawa's decoy force finally managed to draw the American carriers off to the north. However, Kurita's retrograde movement proved to be only temporary, and he once again reversed course and headed back toward San Bernardino Strait. With Oldendorf regrouping his warships in Leyte Gulf and Halsey off chasing the Japanese Navy's aircraft carriers, only three Task Groups—composed of escort carriers, destroyers, and destroyer escorts—remained off Samar island between Kurita and Leyte Gulf. USS White Plains was an element of "Taffy 3," the northmost of the three Task Groups, and the one which bore the brunt of Kurita's surface onslaught. "Taffy 3", commanded by Rear Admiral Clifton Sprague, first learned of Kurita's presence when, at 0637, a pilot on routine air patrol spotted Kurita's task force and attacked it with depth charges. Rear Admiral Sprague was incredulous about the presence of the Japanese Navy, and he demanded identification verification—which came, disconcertingly enough, when the enemy battleships' pagoda-style masts loomed over the horizon.

Yamato opened fire at 0659 at an estimated range of 34,500 yards (17 nautical miles), targeting White Plains with her first four salvoes. Yamato's third salvo was a close straddle landing at 07:04. One shell from this salvo exploded beneath the turn of White Plains port bilge near frame 142, near her aft (starboard) engine room. While the ship was not struck directly, the mining effect of the under-keel explosion severely damaged her hull, damaged her starboard machinery, and tripped most of the circuit breakers in her electrical network. Prompt and effective damage control restored power and communications within three minutes and she was able to remain in formation by overspeeding her port engine to compensate. The black smoke resulting from the sudden loss of boiler intake air pressure convinced Yamato and Nagato (which was also firing her main battery at White Plains at the time) that they had scored a direct hit and they shifted fire to other targets. For the next two and one-half hours, the Japanese force chased "Taffy 3" southward and subjected the escort carriers and their counterattacking screen to a heavy-caliber cannonade. The aircraft carriers' warplanes fought back, even making dummy runs on the Japanese ships to slow the ships' speed of advance after expending all their bombs, torpedoes, and ammunition. During their counterattacks, USS Johnston, Hoel, and Samuel B. Roberts were sunk by gunfire. Later, USS Gambier Bay was sunk by gunfire as well, while USS Fanshaw Bay, USS Kalinin Bay, Dennis, and Heermann suffered heavy damage.

During the surface phase of the action White Plains's 5-inch gun crew claimed six hits on heavy cruiser Chōkai. It was initially believed that one of these hits caused the Chokai's Type 93 "Long Lance" torpedoes to explode, crippling Chōkai and making it vulnerable to air attack. However, the 2019 discovery by the RV Petrel of the wreck of the Chōkai with her torpedoes intact disproved this theory. Chōkai was later sunk by planes from Ommaney Bay (CVE-79), an escort carrier of Taffy 2. Haguro's detailed action report states that Chokai's immobilizing damage resulted from a bomb hit at 0851.

The Japanese surface force broke off its pursuit from 0912–0917 hours, and after milling around in apparent confusion for a time, retired northward to San Bernardino Strait. The retreat by Kurita's surface force, however, did not end the ordeal for White Plains and her fellow warships. After a 90-minute respite, they suffered harassment from a different quarter. At 1050 hours, a formation of nine Japanese Navy Zeke fighters appeared and began simultaneous kamikaze attacks. Two of them singled out White Plains as their victim. Her antiaircraft gunners responded, hitting one of the intruders, which immediately changed course and crashed into USS St. Lo, which eventually sank. The other aircraft continued on toward White Plains, but her antiaircraft guns finally brought him down yards astern, scattering debris all over the ship's deck and sides, but causing only 11 relatively minor casualties. In the meantime, USS Kitkun Bay and USS Kalinin Bay also suffered from kamikaze crashes, but neither of these proved to be fatal to the carriers. That attack proved to be the final combat action of USS White Plains. She steamed to the naval base at Manus with the other surviving carriers, arriving on 31 October. After an inspection of the damage, it was decided that the battered escort carrier should return to the United States for complete repairs. Accordingly, she departed from Manus on 6 November and headed to the West Coast, arriving at San Diego Harbor on 27 November; repairs began immediately.

Ready for action once more, USS White Plains steamed out of San Diego on 19 January 1945. However, concern about the lingering effects of the hull and machinery damage suffered at Samar kept her off the front lines and she was assigned to ferrying replacement aircraft from their factories in the United States to bases in the western Pacific for the remainder of the war. During the last months of the war, White Plains visited Kwajalein, Hollandia (currently known as Jayapura), Ulithi, Saipan, Guam, Leyte, and Pearl Harbor. All had been scenes of major combat actions in the past, but by this time they had become rear areas. The closest approach to the fighting by White Plains after the Battle off Samar came just after the amphibious landings on Okinawa in April 1945, when she steamed to within 100 miles of the island to launch two squadrons of Marine Corps F4U Corsair fighter planes for duty from air bases on that large island.

=== Post-War ===
The end of hostilities in mid-August found the USS White Plains en route from Pearl Harbor to the West Coast. She arrived at San Pedro, California, on 22 August but soon moved to San Diego. From there, she headed back to the Western Pacific on 6 September to begin Operation Magic Carpet duty bringing American fighting men home from the Pacific Theater. Twenty days later, she arrived in Buckner Bay, Okinawa, where she embarked more than 800 passengers for the voyage to the United States. On 28 September, she pointed her bow eastward and set a course, via Pearl Harbor, for San Diego. The White Plains entered San Diego Harbor on 16 October and disembarked her passengers. After nine days in port, she got underway for Pearl Harbor and stopped there only briefly on 1 November before setting out on the return voyage to the West Coast. The warship visited San Francisco for five days from 7 to 12 November and then headed across the Pacific once more. She entered port at Guam in the Marianas on 27 November, embarked passengers, and then began the return voyage on 30 November. White Plains arrived in Seattle, Washington, on 14 December 1945. She remained there until 30 January 1946, when she embarked upon the voyage, via the Panama Canal and Norfolk, Virginia, to Boston, Massachusetts. The White Plains entered Boston Harbor on 17 February 1946, and then began preparations for decommissioning.

The USS White Plains was decommissioned on 10 July 1946 and was berthed with the Atlantic Reserve Fleet, Boston. She remained with the reserve fleet for 12 years. On 12 June 1955, she was redesignated a utility aircraft carrier (CVU-66). Finally, her name was struck from the Naval Vessel Register on 1 July 1958. She was sold on 29 July to the Hyman Michaels Company, of Chicago for scrapping.

== Awards ==
White Plains earned five battle stars during World War II, as well as the Presidential Unit Citation and Philippine Republic Presidential Unit Citation for her part in the Battle off Samar.
