= Kalininsky District =

Kalininsky or Kalininskyi District may refer to:

- Kalininsky District, Russia, name of several districts and city districts in Russia
- Kalininskyi District, Donetsk, an urban district in Ukraine
- Kalininskyi District, Horlivka, an urban district in Ukraine

== See also ==
- Kalinin (disambiguation)
- Kalininsk (disambiguation)
- Kalininsky (disambiguation)
