= Kalininsky District, Russia =

Kalininsky District is the name of several administrative and municipal districts in Russia. The districts are generally named for Mikhail Kalinin, a Soviet statesman.

== Districts of the federal subjects ==
Federal subjects of Russia which have an entity called Kalininsky District

- Kalininsky District, Krasnodar Krai, an administrative and municipal district of Krasnodar Krai
- Kalininsky District, Saratov Oblast, an administrative and municipal district of Saratov Oblast
- Kalininsky District, Tver Oblast, an administrative and municipal district of Tver Oblast
- Kalininsky District, Saint Petersburg, an administrative district of the federal city of St. Petersburg

=== Former districts ===
- Kalininsky District, Moscow, a former district of Moscow

== City divisions ==
- Kalininsky City District, Cheboksary, a city district of Cheboksary, the capital of the Chuvash Republic
- Kalininsky City District, Chelyabinsk, an administrative and municipal city district of Chelyabinsk, the administrative center of Chelyabinsk Oblast
- Kalininsky City District, Novosibirsk, a city district of Novosibirsk, the administrative center of Novosibirsk Oblast
- Kalininsky Administrative Okrug, an administrative okrug of the city of Tyumen, the administrative center of Tyumen Oblast
- Kalininsky City District, Ufa, a city district of Ufa, the capital of the Republic of Bashkortostan
Cities in Russia with a city division called "Kalininsky"

== See also ==
- Kalininsky (disambiguation)
- Kalinin (disambiguation)
- Kalininsk (disambiguation)
