= Kalininsky (rural locality) =

Kalininsky (Russian: Калининский; masculine), Kalininskaya (Калининская; feminine), or Kalininskoye (Калининское; neuter) is the name of several rural localities in Russia:

- Kalininsky, Altai Krai, a settlement in Soloneshensky District of Altai Krai
- Kalininsky, name of several other rural localities
- Kalininskaya, Krasnodar Krai, a stanitsa in Kalininsky District of Krasnodar Krai
- Kalininskaya, Rostov Oblast, a stanitsa in Tsimlyansky District of Rostov Oblast
- Kalininskaya, name of several other rural localities
- Kalininskoye, Republic of Bashkortostan, a village in Iglinsky District of the Republic of Bashkortostan
- Kalininskoye, name of several other rural localities
