= USS Fanshaw Bay =

Casablanca-class escort carrier of the U.S. Navy

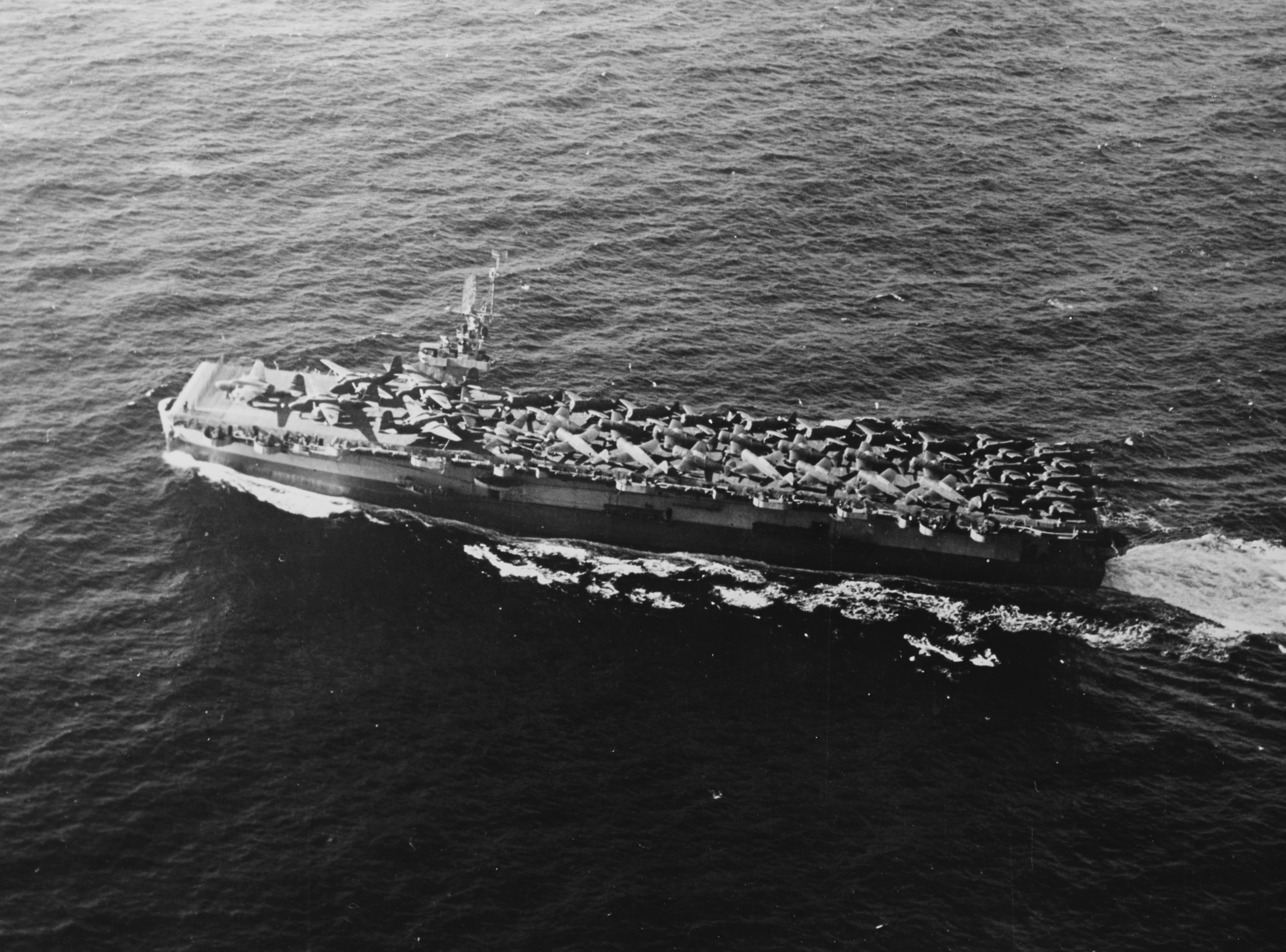
- USS Fanshaw Bay (CVE-70), on a transport run, 17 January 1944

History

United States
- Name: Fanshaw Bay
- Namesake: Fanshaw Bay, Cape Fanshaw, Alaska
- Ordered: as a Type S4-S2-BB3 hull, MCE hull 1107
- Awarded: 18 June 1942
- Builder: Kaiser Shipyards
- Laid down: 18 May 1943
- Launched: 1 November 1943
- Commissioned: 9 December 1943
- Decommissioned: 14 August 1946
- Stricken: 1 March 1959
- Identification: Hull symbol: CVE-70
- Nickname(s): Fannie Bee
- Honors and awards: 5 Battle stars, a Presidential Unit Citation for conduct during the Battle off Samar
- Fate: Sold for scrap, 26 August 1959

General characteristics
- Class & type: Casablanca-class escort carrier
- Displacement: 8,188 long tons (8,319 t) (standard); 10,902 long tons (11,077 t) (full load)
- Length: 512 ft 3 in (156.13 m) (oa); 490 ft (150 m) (wl); 474 ft (144 m) (fd)
- Beam: 65 ft 2 in (19.86 m); 108 ft (33 m) (extreme width)
- Draft: 20 ft 9 in (6.32 m) (max)
- Installed power: 4 × Babcock & Wilcox boilers; 9,000 shp (6,700 kW)
- Propulsion: 2 × Skinner Unaflow reciprocating steam engines; 2 × screws
- Speed: 19 knots (35 km/h; 22 mph)
- Range: 10,240 nmi (18,960 km; 11,780 mi) at 15 kn (28 km/h; 17 mph)
- Complement: Total: 910 – 916 officers and men; Embarked Squadron: 50 – 56; Ship's Crew: 860
- Armament: As designed: 1 × 5 in (127 mm)/38 cal dual-purpose gun; 4 × twin 40 mm (1.57 in) Bofors anti-aircraft guns; 12 × 20 mm (0.79 in) Oerlikon anti-aircraft cannons; Varied, ultimate armament: 1 × 5 in (127 mm)/38 cal dual-purpose gun; 8 × twin 40 mm (1.57 in) Bofors anti-aircraft guns; 20 × 20 mm (0.79 in) Oerlikon anti-aircraft cannons
- Aircraft carried: 27 – 30 (combat operations)
- Aviation facilities: 1 × catapult; 2 × elevators

Service record
- Part of: United States Pacific Fleet (1943–1946); Pacific Reserve Fleet (1946–1959)
- Operations: Mariana and Palau Islands campaign; Battle of Morotai; Philippines campaign; Battle off Samar; Battle of Okinawa; Operation Magic Carpet

USS Fanshaw Bay (CVE-70) was a Casablanca-class escort carrier of the United States Navy. She was named after Fanshaw Bay, located within Cape Fanshaw, of the Alexander Archipelago in the Territory of Alaska. The cape was given its name by Charles Mitchell Thomas, who was mapping the area, in 1887. Built for service during World War II, the ship was launched in November 1943, and commissioned in December, and served in support of the Mariana and Palau Islands campaign, the Battle off Samar, and the Battle of Okinawa. Postwar, she participated in Operation Magic Carpet. She was decommissioned in August 1946, when she was mothballed in the Pacific Reserve Fleet. Ultimately, she was sold for scrapping in September 1959.

== Design and description ==
A side profile of the design of Thetis Bay.

Fanshaw Bay was a Casablanca-class escort carrier, the most numerous type of aircraft carriers ever built. Built to stem heavy losses during the Battle of the Atlantic, they came into service in late 1943, by which time the U-boat threat was already in retreat. Although some did see service in the Atlantic, the majority were utilized in the Pacific, ferrying aircraft, providing logistics support, and conducting close air support for the island-hopping campaigns. The Casablanca-class carriers were built on the standardized Type S4-S2-BB3 hull, a lengthened variant of the Doyen-class hull, and specifically designed to be mass-produced using welded prefabricated sections. This allowed them to be produced at unprecedented speeds: the final ship of her class, Munda, was delivered to the Navy just 101 days after the laying of her keel.

Fanshaw Bay was 512 ft 3 in (156.13 m) long overall (490 ft (150 m) at the waterline), had a beam of 65 ft 2 in (19.86 m), and a draft of 20 ft 9 in (6.32 m). She displaced 8,188 long tons (8,319 t) standard, which increased to 10,902 long tons (11,077 t) with a full load. To carry out flight operations, the ship had a 257 ft (78 m) hangar deck and a 474 ft (144 m) flight deck. Her compact size necessitated the installation of an aircraft catapult at her bow, and there were two aircraft elevators to facilitate movement of aircraft between the flight and hangar deck: one each fore and aft.

She was powered by four Babcock & Wilcox Express D boilers that raised 285 psi (1,970 kPa) of steam at 577 °F (303 °C). The steam generated by these boilers fed two Skinner Unaflow reciprocating steam engines, delivering 9,000 hp (6,700 kW) to two propeller shafts. This allowed her to reach speeds of 19 kn (35 km/h; 22 mph), with a cruising range of 10,240 nmi (18,960 km; 11,780 mi) at 15 kn (28 km/h; 17 mph). For armament, one 5 in (127 mm)/38 caliber dual-purpose gun was mounted on the stern. Additional anti-aircraft defense was provided by eight Bofors 40 mm (1.57 in) anti-aircraft guns in single mounts and twelve Oerlikon 20 mm (0.79 in) cannons mounted around the perimeter of the deck. By 1945, Casablanca-class carriers had been modified to carry twenty Oerlikon cannons and sixteen Bofors guns; the doubling of the latter was accomplished by putting them into twin mounts. Sensors onboard consisted of a SG surface-search radar and a SK air-search radar.

Although Casablanca-class escort carriers were intended to function with a crew of 860 and an embarked squadron of 50 to 56, the exigencies of wartime often necessitated the inflation of the crew count. They were designed to operate with 27 aircraft, but the hangar deck could accommodate much more during transport or training missions.

During the Mariana and Palau Islands campaign, the beginning of the Philippines campaign, and the Battle off Samar, she carried 16 FM-2 Wildcat fighters, and 12 TBM-1C Avenger torpedo bombers, for a total of 28 aircraft. However, during the Battle of Okinawa, she carried 24 FM-2 fighters and 6 TBM-3 torpedo bombers for a total of 30 aircraft.

== Construction ==
The escort carrier was laid down on 18 May 1943, under a Maritime Commission contract, MC hull 1107, by Kaiser Shipbuilding Company, Vancouver, Washington. She was named Fanshaw Bay, as part of a tradition which named escort carriers after bays or sounds in Alaska. She was launched on 1 November 1943; sponsored by Mrs. Lorna V. Kenworthy, the wife of Captain Jesse L. Kenworthy Jr., who was the executive officer of the battleship Oklahoma during the Attack on Pearl Harbor. She was transferred to the United States Navy and commissioned on 9 December 1943, with Captain Douglass Pollock Johnson in command.

== Service history ==
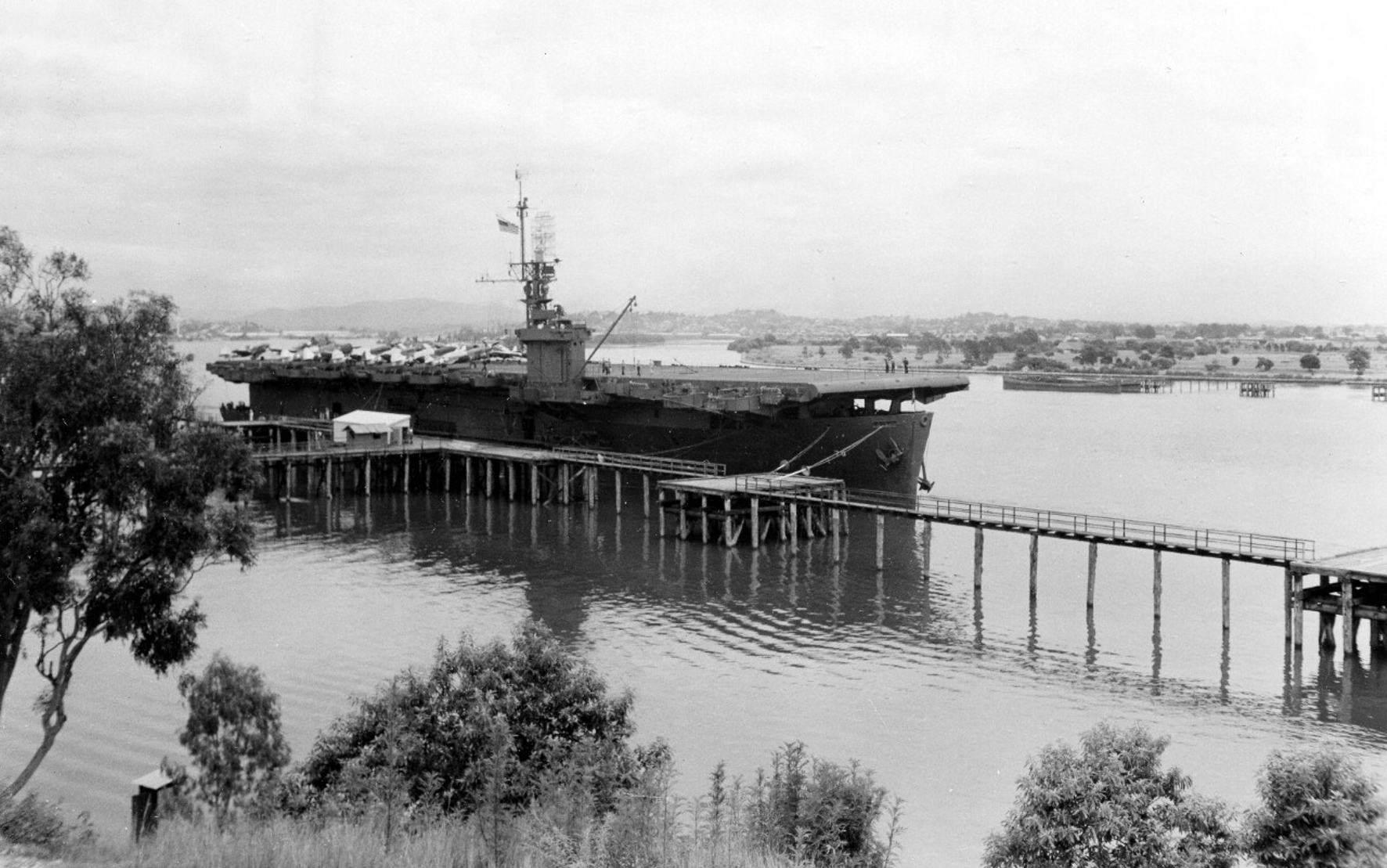
Fanshaw Bay moored at Brisbane, Australia, on 10 February 1944, following a transport mission. Note that there are still Republic P-47 Thunderbolt fighters stored on-board her flight deck.

Upon being commissioned, Fanshaw Bay took on armaments at Port Townsend, Washington on 31 December, and proceeded on a shakedown cruise down the West Coast. During this period, she stopped at Port Angeles, Washington from 6 January 1944 to 8 January, along with another pause at San Francisco, California between 11 and 16 January, where she took on a load of aircraft. She was also assigned to become the flagship of Carrier Division 25, commanded by Rear Admiral Gerald F. Bogan. She departed from San Francisco on 16 January, ferrying her load to Gladstone, Queensland, arriving on 2 February. On her return trip, she touched at Brisbane from 8 to 12 February, and at Nouméa from 15 to 16 February.

Upon returning, she underwent maintenance and her crew underwent leave at San Diego from 4 March to 6 April. There, Fanshaw Bay received her aircraft contingent, originally intended to be Composite Squadron 4 (VC-4), but switched to Composite Squadron 68 (VC-68), which consisted of 16 FM-2 fighters and 10 TBM-1C torpedo bombers. She departed San Diego on 6 April, accompanied by the seaplane tender Orca, making a stop at Pearl Harbor on 10 April, and arriving at Majuro on 20 April. En route, on 11 April, one of her torpedo bombers crashed in an accident, with its crew being rescued by Orca. Upon arriving at Majuro, she began conducting antisubmarine patrols, along with the destroyer escorts John C. Butler, Raymond, and Richard M. Rowell. Ten days of patrols returned no contacts, and she retired to Pearl Harbor.

=== Mariana and Palau Islands campaign ===
On 29 May, she sortied from Pearl Harbor, bound for Eniwetok Atoll, where she acted as the flagship of Task Group 52.14, which was assigned to support the upcoming Mariana and Palau Islands campaign. En route, two of her Wildcats were lost, and another was slightly damaged, through accidents. She began combat operations on 11 June, some 30 mi (48 km) west of Saipan, providing aerial reconnaissance, close air support, and antisubmarine patrols in support of the Battle of Saipan. On 15 June, at 17:15 in the late afternoon, the officers of Fanshaw Bay received a report of five Japanese aircraft proceeding towards her task group 71 mi (114 km) to her southwest. Fighters were scrambled, and the aircraft were intercepted 36 mi (58 km) away, harrying them as they quickly proceeded towards the carriers. Four of them were shot down, although a fifth aircraft was able to drop a torpedo aimed at Fanshaw Bay at 18:12. Fortunately for the carrier, the Japanese plane approaching from the starboard bow, perhaps disrupted by the anti-aircraft fire, dropped its torpedo at a slight turn. Therefore, Fanshaw Bay engaged in a hard right turn, easily dodging the torpedo. The Japanese aircraft was subsequently shot down at 18:15.

On 17 June, one of Fanshaw Bay's torpedo bombers conducting antisubmarine patrols crashed shortly after takeoff, veering port into the sea. A large explosion was triggered, likely from the detonation of one of the bomber's depth charges, killing all three of its crew. Later that day, another torpedo bomber was lost, and although two of the crew were recovered, the radioman drowned with the aircraft. In the late afternoon, the task group detected about seventy Japanese aircraft approaching quickly from the southeast, 40 mi (64 km) out. Fighters were scrambled, and Fanshaw Bay launched fourteen Wildcats to supplement the thirty-two launched by the other escort carriers. Her fighters, intercepting the planes, shot down one. Nonetheless, the Japanese force penetrated the air screen, and made for the carriers. Early on in the attack, the Japanese planes focused on Fanshaw Bay and White Plains. Her anti-aircraft guns provided adept assistance, shooting down three planes, and damaging two more.

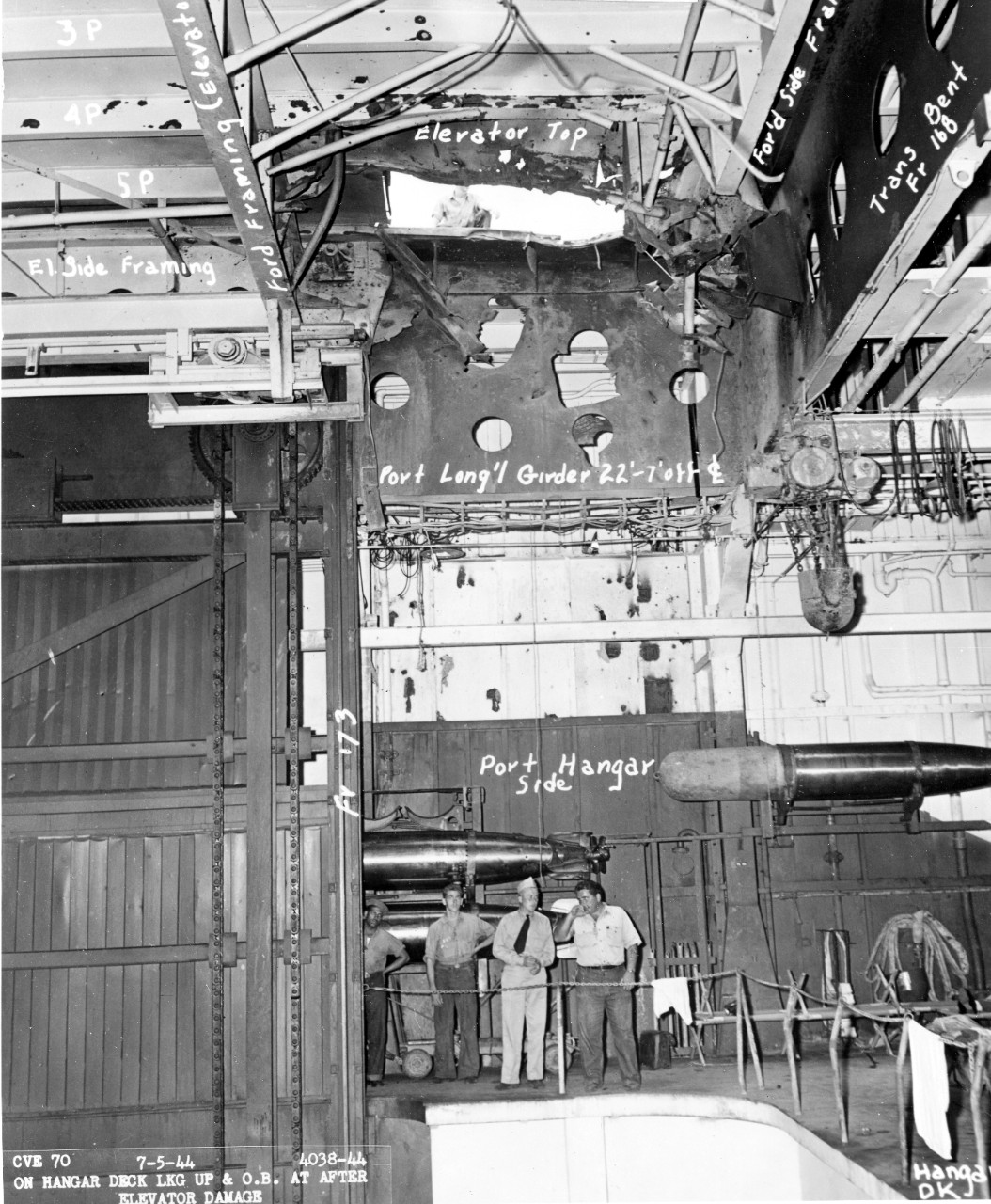
Sailors inspect the damage created from the 250 lb (110 kg) bomb which smashed through Fanshaw Bay's aft aircraft elevator.

However, at 18:52, a Japanese bomber made a run for Fanshaw Bay, dropping a bomb (believed to be 250 lb (110 kg)) as it flew about 1,500 ft (460 m) above the carrier. The bomb penetrated into her aft aircraft elevator, punching through the wooden decking, and detonating within the hangar bay, some 5 ft (1.5 m) below the flight deck. Shrapnel was launched through the hangar, instantly killing eleven men of Repair Party 3, which had taken up position forward of the elevator. Munitions were stored on both sides of the elevator, and shrapnel sliced through three torpedoes, although they failed to detonate. Nonetheless, the blast had enough force to rupture a fire main, sever electrical cables, and to even eject depth charges from the bomb bays of the Avengers stored within the hangar deck. In addition, several fires were kindled, total steering control was lost, and the ship acquired a 3° list to the port.

Although the fires were quickly put under control by the crew, several of her aircraft were compelled to land on other carriers as a result of the blazes. In the action, three planes from her aircraft contingent were lost in the turmoil, albeit there were no fatalities. Rear Admiral Bogan was also compelled to transfer his flag to the destroyer Porterfield in order to more effectively lead the fleet. The rest of Fanshaw Bay's damage was not so easily resolved. Steering control was not regained until 3:55 in the morning of 18 June. Of even greater concern to the ship's officers was that of her list, with her stern sinking 6 ft (1.8 m) lower than design specifications. Originally, they believed that the ship's outer skin had been penetrated, letting seawater in. Further investigation revealed that the cause for the list came from the ruptured fire main, which the damage control teams struggled to plug. Bogan, continuously frustrated by the progress of damage control, later complained in a 1969 interview that Fanshaw Bay was "the worst ship [he’d] ever seen in any Navy" and that "the entire complement was incompetent." Regardless of opinions, Fanshaw Bay suffered 14 dead and 23 wounded from the attack.

On 18 June, at 11:30 in the morning, her dead were buried at sea in a ceremony. Fanshaw Bay retired from operations and proceeded to Pearl Harbor for a long period of repairs. Nonetheless, limited flight operations continued, with a fighter pilot perishing in an accident on 29 June.

=== Battle of Morotai ===
Upon finishing her repairs, Fanshaw Bay continued acting as the flagship of Carrier Division 25, now under the command of Rear Admiral Clifton A. F. Sprague. After departing from Pearl Harbor, she arrived at Manus Island, of the Admiralty Islands. Fanshaw Bay, along with five other escort carriers and a screen of eight destroyer escorts, was assigned to Task Group 77.1, which would support the landings on Morotai. Notably, her aircraft contingent had been swapped, and she now hosted Composite Squadron 66 (VC-66). She departed Manus on 10 September, and she began air support operations on 15 September. On 17 September, two Avengers, one from Fanshaw Bay, collided while moving into formation on an antisubmarine patrol. Of the six men involved, only a single survivor was recovered by the submarine chaser PC-1137. On 19 September, Fanshaw Bay lost another aircraft, with one of her Wildcats, diving on a Zero, missing and exploding on contact with the water. The carrier continued to hemorrhage aircraft, with an additional two fighters and a torpedo bomber crashing by 27 September.

On 3 October, the majority of the escort carriers had already retired, leaving only Fanshaw Bay and St. Lo to continue operations. Fanshaw Bay was preparing to retire back to Manus during the night. At the time, her task group was operating 35 mi (56 km) to the north of the island, when the Japanese submarine Ro-41 fired a spread of torpedoes towards the escort carriers. The first indicator of a torpedo attack occurred when a torpedo was spotted passing to the front of St. Lo, and off the port beam of Fanshaw Bay. Before maneuvers could be conducted, a second torpedo detonated on the destroyer escort Shelton, killing thirteen, and wounding twenty-two. The destroyer screen commenced dropping depth charges, forcing Ro-41 away.

=== Battle off Samar ===
Fanshaw Bay quietly retired back to Manus, where preparations began for the Philippines campaign. More specifically, Fanshaw Bay, as the flagship for "Taffy 3", would be providing aerial cover for the planned landings on the island of Leyte. After a brief period of replenishment at Manus from 7 to 12 October, Fanshaw Bay set off for the Philippines. En route, on 16 October, Fanshaw Bay lost yet another aircraft to an accident, with one of her fighters wrecking itself on the flight deck, before being caught by an arresting cable, which resulted in the aircraft precariously dangling over her port side. Her crew, and after a short while, the aircraft, were subsequently recovered.

At the time of the invasion, Taffy 3 consisted of Fanshaw Bay, St. Lo, White Plains, Kalinin Bay, Kitkun Bay, and Gambier Bay, along with an accompanying screen of three destroyers and four destroyer escorts. As the U.S. fleet gathered off the Philippines, the Japanese garrison on Suluan managed to alert their command. This prompted Admiral Soemu Toyoda to launch Shō-Gō 1, a gambit to defend Japan's access to the oil fields of Southeast Asia. On 18 and 19 October, Taffy 3 conducted strikes against Japanese bases located within Cebu, Negros, and Panay, destroying a total of thirty-eight planes, and damaging twenty-eight more. She then steamed off the island of Samar from 20 to 25 October, providing air support for U.S. forces onshore, and dropping leaflets on Japanese positions. In the meantime, Admiral William Halsey Jr. led his Third Fleet northwards, after spotting Vice Admiral Jisaburō Ozawa's diversionary Northern Force. Thus, the only ships covering the vulnerable landing crafts of Leyte Gulf were the three escort carrier task groups and their screens. Taffy 3, the northmost task group, would bear the brunt of Vice Admiral Takeo Kurita's Center Force as it swung through the San Bernardino Strait.

On the early morning of 25 October, Kurita's Center Force had already crossed the San Bernardino Strait unmolested, and was entering the open waters of Leyte Gulf. White Plains's radar had possibly spotted the Japanese force maneuvering into position at 3:00, but this information was disregarded by the ship's command. Although World War II era surface radar was notoriously faulty, the speed and course of the spotted blip was consistent with the course set by the Center Force.

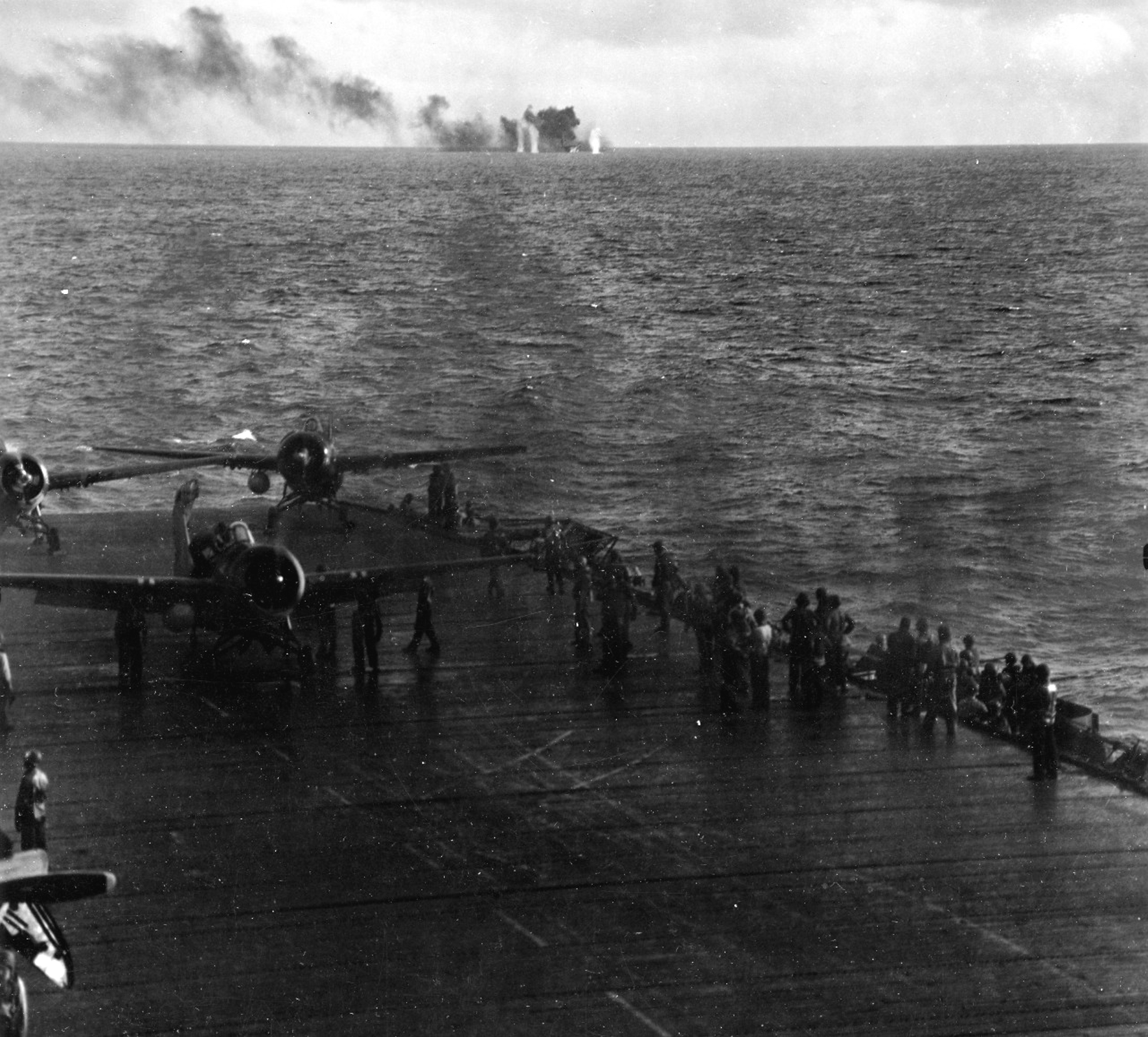
Photographed from the escort carrier Kitkun Bay, Fanshaw Bay is shown surrounded by shell splashes from a Japanese battleship, likely the IJN Kongo or Haruna. In the foreground, three FM-2 Wildcat fighters are preparing for launching.

At 4:30, the escort carriers went to general quarters in preparation for another round of airstrikes and close air support. By 5:30, Taffy 3 had launched twelve fighters to conduct a combat air patrol, before launching another two Wildcats and four Avengers shortly afterwards. The task group continued launching aircraft throughout the morning. By the time of the attack, Fanshaw Bay therefore only had twelve aircraft on hand, none of which were equipped to deal with heavily armed surface warships. The first indication of Japanese contact happened shortly after 6:30, when Taffy 3 experienced three almost simultaneous warnings. Firstly, they began receiving unencrypted Japanese chatter. Secondly, they spotted antiaircraft fire, estimated at 20 mi (32 km) to the north, where there was known to be no Allied surface presence. In fact, an Avenger from St. Lo had stumbled into the midst of the Japanese fleet, and began radioing Rear Admiral Sprague warnings. Thirdly, Fanshaw Bay's radar operators spotted an unmistakable surface signature of unknown surface ships just 18.5 mi (29.8 km) away.

Upon coming to an understanding of the severity of the situation, Sprague ordered Taffy 3 to steam eastward, in hopes of being shielded by a passing rain squall. At 6:52, Fanshaw Bay launched the remaining twelve of her planes, which consisted of a single Wildcat, and eleven Avengers. Of the Avengers, ten were carrying a single 500 lb (230 kg) semi-armor piercing bomb, and one was carrying two 350 lb (160 kg) depth charges. Sprague also radioed for assistance from Vice Admiral Jesse B. Oldendorf, the commander of Task Group 77.2, which had just defeated the Southern Force in the Battle of Surigao Strait. Unfortunately for Sprague, Oldendorf was at least three hours sail away, Task Group 77.2 was scattered over an immense distance because of the previous night's battle, and it was low on both fuel and ammunition. Taffy 3 would have to confront the Center Force by itself.

Fanshaw Bay and White Plains were located on the west flank, and therefore bore the opening volleys of the engagement. Beginning at 6:58, both of the carriers came under fire from the Japanese task group, which was situated about 16.6 mi (26.7 km) away. The Japanese were firing dye-marked shells to gauge their aim, and the escort carriers were, much to the concern of their command, straddled in plumes of colored water. The officers would certainly be more concerned if they were able to correspond the color of the dyed water to that of a particular Japanese ship, as plumes of red, green, blue, purple, pink and yellow dyed water started to dot the ocean. Unbeknownst to the crew, the pink dyes corresponded to the Japanese battleship Yamato, with its 18 in (460 mm) guns, the largest ever manufactured, and the yellow dyes corresponded to the Japanese battleship Kongo, with its 14 in (360 mm) guns. Fortunately for Fanshaw Bay's crew, as the shells slowly creeped up to her stern, she happened across a passing rain squall at 7:03, reducing visibility to just 0.5 mi (0.80 km).

At the same time that Fanshaw Bay was being harried by shells, the twelve aircraft that she had launched, joined by four fighters which had been on patrol, commenced attacks against the leading Japanese ships. Their attacks were mostly ineffective, mostly due to their light armaments and a general lack of coordination. The task group emerged from the rain squall by 7:23, but it was not until 7:50 that Fanshaw Bay came under concentrated fire again. At 7:50, four 8 in (200 mm) shells made impact with her hull, with another two missing just in front of her bow. One shell penetrated through a ventilator, killing two men as it tore into the carrier. Another shell passed under one of her Bofors guns, tearing the face off of one of her crew. Deflected by the gun's shield, the shell ricocheted over her flight deck. Another shell destroyed her catapult track, and resulted in a small explosion within her flag office. Four small fires had been kindled by these shells, but they were quickly put under control, along with a minor issue with flooding. Although four men had been killed in the attack, her operational capability was not significantly compromised. Rather, Fanshaw Bay's 5 in (130 mm) gun responded by firing against one of the leading Japanese cruisers, landing at least five hits against its superstructure.

Fanshaw Bay continued whilst under concentrated fire for the next hour, conducting a variety of evasive maneuvers. At 8:35, with the task force weaving back and forth, Fanshaw Bay had a close call with the destroyer Heermann, narrowly avoiding a collision. Despite the addition of smoke screens, and the heroic defense of her escorts, by 8:55, the Japanese had already closed the distance to only 6.25 mi (10.06 km). During the intervening period, the Japanese shells had sparked a series of fires, which the damage control parties struggled to contain, and the situation seemed to be deteriorating. She was also forced to dodge torpedo attacks launched by the Japanese destroyer screen. Fortunately for her crew, Admiral Kurita, discouraged by the dogged defense of Taffy 3 and his losses, harried by constant air attacks, and believing that he was facing an equal or perhaps a superior force, was convinced to withdraw. At 9:25, to the bewilderment of Rear Admiral Sprague, the Japanese fleet turned around and retired.

In the chaos of the action, Fanshaw Bay lost four Wildcats and an Avenger. In addition, Gambier Bay was severely damaged and sunk as a result of Japanese naval gunfire, with her survivors being left behind by the beleaguered task force. As Taffy 3 retired to the southeast following the engagement, five Japanese kamikaze Zeroes, along with four escorting fighters, were spotted at 10:51. The first kamikaze aimed for Kitkun Bay, but its aim was off, only clipping the carrier before detonating over the flight deck and plunging into the ocean. The second and third planes went for Fanshaw Bay. The first plane to approach was shot down by her 5 in (130 mm) gun, and it nosedived into the ocean. However, one of its bombs still exploded some 15 ft (4.6 m) from her hull, sending shrapnel across the carrier. As the other kamikaze maneuvered into a position to strike the ship, it was shot down a safe distance from the carrier by her anti-aircraft gunners. The fourth kamikaze proceeded towards White Plains, but only clipped the carrier, inflicting minor damage. The fifth kamikaze plunged towards, and sunk St. Lo with the loss of 113 lives. Even more kamikazes attempted to follow on the successful attack on St. Lo, but accurate anti-aircraft fire and an effective fighter screen ensured that the carriers sustained no more substantial damage.

With her destroyer screen detached to recover the survivors of St. Lo, Fanshaw Bay retired towards Manus, recovering aircraft from the action throughout the day. At the end of the day, the carrier's crew had suffered four dead, and four wounded, with three having to be transferred to for treatment ashore. Arriving at Manus on 1 November, she replenished until 7 November, and proceeded back to the West Coast, making a stop at Pearl Harbor. She arrived at San Diego, where repairs were made for the damage sustained in the Battle off Samar. On 10 January 1945, Captain Murr Edward Arnold took over command of the vessel. In addition, a new aircraft contingent, Composite Spotting Squadron 2 (VOC-2), was embarked upon the carrier. Upon finishing repairs, she steamed for the waters off of Hawaii, where training operations were conducted, along with routine patrols.

=== Battle of Okinawa ===
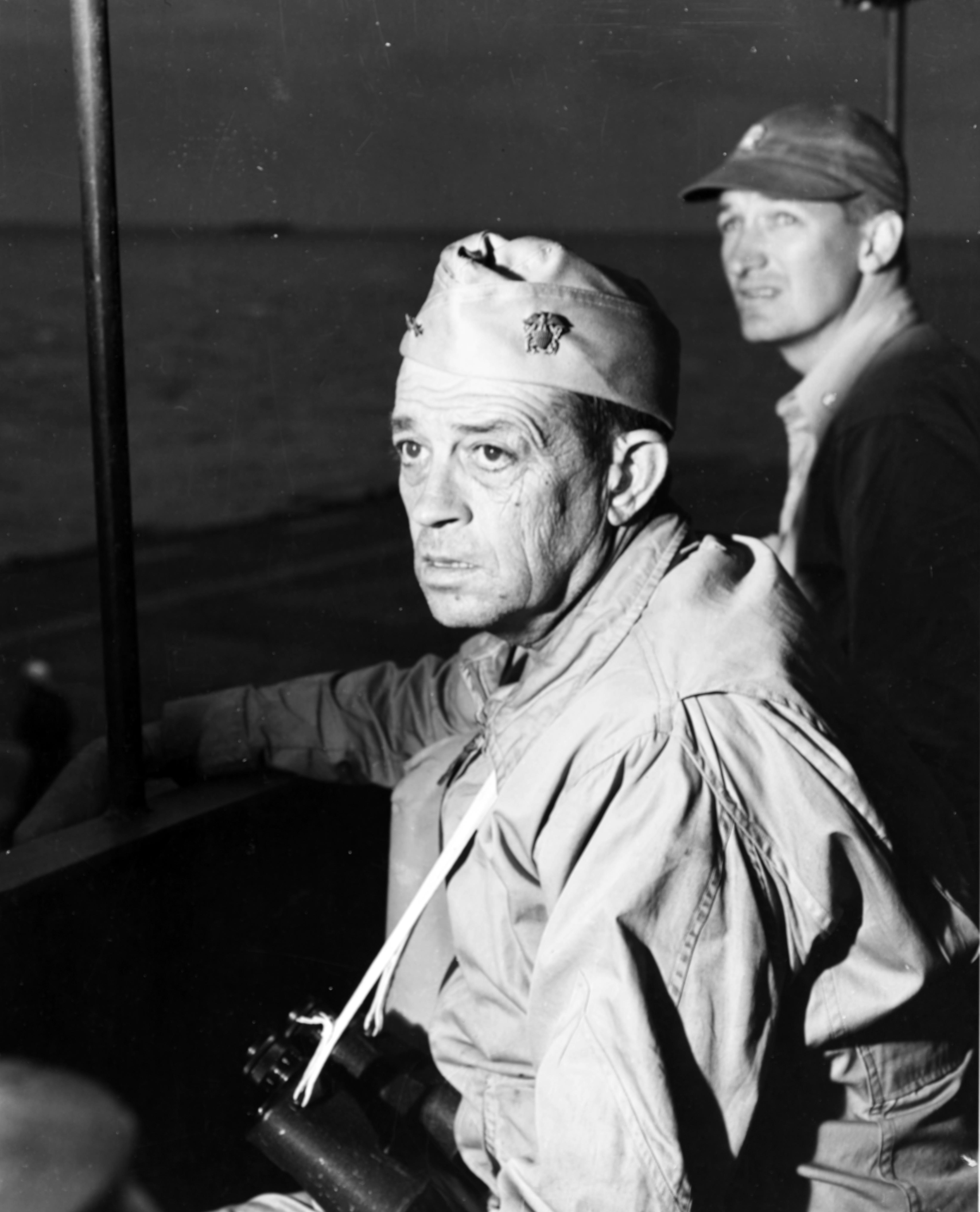
Rear Admiral Sprague photographed on the bridge of Fanshaw Bay, as the Okinawa landings proceeded, circa April 1945.

After finishing training, she sailed westwards to Ulithi, arriving on 14 March. There, she was designated as the flagship of Carrier Division 26, under the command of Rear Admiral Sprague. Preparations were made for the upcoming landings on Okinawa. On 21 March, she departed for Okinawa, and her aircraft began combat operations on 25 March. Her planes supported the initial landings on 1 April, providing extensive close air support, and neutralizing Japanese positions. On 7 April, Rear Admiral Ernest Wheeler Litch took over command of Carrier Division 26. Fanshaw Bay remained on station off of Okinawa for sixty-nine consecutive days, and her air contingent flew 2,089 sorties in the battle, claiming five Japanese planes. Throughout the operation, she witnessed near constant kamikaze attacks, with some 1,465 Japanese kamikazes involved.

Following a short period of replenishment at San Pedro Bay, Fanshaw Bay again returned to Okinawa, arriving off of the Sakishima Islands on 9 June to continue launching airstrikes. She continued these operations until 27 June, when she was assigned to Task Force 39, commanded by Rear Admiral Alexander Sharp. Consisting of 107 minesweepers, seven minelayers, and seven netlayers, the Task Force began minesweeping operations within the East China Sea, beginning on 5 July. Fanshaw Bay, along with three other escort carriers, provided an aerial screen for the minesweepers, and launched strikes against targets situated around the mouth of the Yangtze River on 28 July. On 30 July, she withdrew from the operations, having assisted the minesweepers in clearing 404 mines over 7,300 sq mi (19,000 km^{2}), with no loss in ships, despite the occasional Japanese submarine or plane.

Fanshaw Bay anchored within Nakagusuku Bay, where she endured further kamikaze and submarine incursions. She then steamed for Guam and Eniwetok, where she loaded aircraft. She was assigned to Vice Admiral Frank Jack Fletcher's Ninth Fleet, which was operating off of the Aleutian Islands. As she departed from Eniwetok, she received news of the Japanese surrender on August 15.

=== Post-war ===
With the conclusion of offensive operations, Fanshaw Bay proceeded northwards, mooring at Kuluk Bay, Adak Island. There, she joined Task Force 44, and sailed southwards to assist in the Japanese occupation. She operated off of Japan between 31 August and 9 September, covering troops as they landed on Hokkaido. After the formal signing of surrender by the Japanese garrison on Hokkaido on 9 September, she returned to Pearl Harbor, arriving on 24 September.

At Pearl Harbor, she joined the "Magic Carpet" fleet, which repatriated U.S. servicemen from throughout the Pacific. She cruised around the Pacific, making stops and returning U.S. servicemen back to the mainland, sailing a total of 23,500 mi (37,800 km) along the way, and with an average of 1,400 passengers on-board during each journey. She first steamed for San Francisco, arriving on 20 October, took on passengers at Pearl Harbor on 27 October, and returned her passengers to San Diego on 4 November. She then made a trip to Japan, arriving at Tokyo Bay on 28 November, returning to the West Coast on 18 December, where she was discharged from the "Magic Carpet" fleet.

Following release, Fanshaw Bay sailed northwards, arriving at Port Angeles, Washington, on 26 January 1946. Inactivation work began at Tacoma on 29 January, and she was decommissioned on 14 August. She was mothballed as part of the Pacific Reserve Fleet, and she was redesignated as a helicopter escort carrier whilst in reserve on 12 June 1955. She was struck from the Navy list on 1 March 1959, and sold for scrapping on 29 August to Hyman-Michaels Co., Chicago. She was ultimately broken up in Portland, Oregon, later that year. Fanshaw Bay received five battle stars for World War II service, and along with the rest of Taffy 3, received the Presidential Unit Citation for conduct during the Battle off Samar.

== Sources ==
=== Online sources ===
- "Fanshaw Bay (CVE-70)". Dictionary of American Naval Fighting Ships. Naval History and Heritage Command. 23 October 2019. Archived from the original on 5 December 2019. This article incorporates text from this source, which is in the public domain.
- "Kaiser Vancouver, Vancouver WA". www.ShipbuildingHistory.com. 27 November 2010. Archived from the original on 16 June 2019.

=== Bibliography ===
- Adcock, Al (1996), Escort Carriers in Action - Warships No. 9, Carrollton, Texas: Squadron/Signal Publications, ISBN 9780897473569
- Bogan, Gerald F. (1986), Reminiscences of Vice Admiral Gerald F. Bogan, U.S. Navy (Retired)., Annapolis, Maryland: United States Naval Institute, OCLC 15714813
- Chesneau, Robert; Gardiner, Robert (1980), Conway's All the World's Fighting Ships 1922–1946, London, England: Naval Institute Press, ISBN 9780870219139
- Friedman, Norman (1983), U.S. Aircraft Carriers: An Illustrated Design History, Annapolis, Maryland: Naval Institute Press, ISBN 9780870217395
- Rielly, Robin (2010), Kamikaze Attacks of World War II: A Complete History of Japanese Suicide Strikes on American Ships, by Aircraft and Other Means, Jefferson, North Carolina: McFarland & Company, ISBN 9780786457724
- Ross, Al (1993), The Escort Carrier Gambier Bay, Anatomy of the Ship, London, England: Conway Maritime Press, ISBN 9781557502353
- Y'Blood, William (2012), The Little Giants: U.S. Escort Carriers Against Japan, Annapolis, Maryland: Naval Institute Press, ISBN 9781612512471
- Hornfischer, James D. (2004), The Last Stand of the Tin Can Sailors: The Extraordinary Story World War II Story of the U.S. Navy's Finest Hour, New York City, New York: Bantam Books, ISBN 9781616372774
- "Straddled: A short history of the U.S.S. Fanshaw Bay", Regimental Histories, World War Regimental Histories, United States Navy, 1946
