= Kalininsky =

Kalininsky (masculine), Kalininskaya (feminine), or Kalininskoye (neuter) may refer to:

- Kalininsky District, name of several districts in the countries of the former Soviet Union
- Kalininsky (rural locality) (Kalininskaya, Kalininskoye), name of several rural localities in Russia
- Kalininskaya Line, a line of the Moscow Metro, Moscow, Russia

== See also ==
- Kalinin (disambiguation)
- Kalininsk (disambiguation)
