= Aleksandr Gamanenko =

Russian agronomist and politician (1937–2022)

Member of the State Duma
- In office 19 December 1999 – 7 December 2003

Personal details
- Born: Aleksandr Ivanovich Gamanenko; 8 January 1937
- Died: 22 November 2022 (aged 85) Kalininskaya, Krasnodar Krai, Russia
- Party: CPRF
- Education: Kuban State Agrarian University
- Occupation: Agronomist

Aleksandr Ivanovich Gamanenko (Russian: Александр Иванович Гаманенко; 8 January 1937 – 22 November 2022) was a Russian agronomist and politician. A member of the Communist Party of the Russian Federation, he served in the State Duma from 1999 to 2003.

Gamanenko died in Kalininskaya on 22 November 2022 at the age of 85.
