= USS St. Lo =

Casablanca-class escort carrier of the US Navy

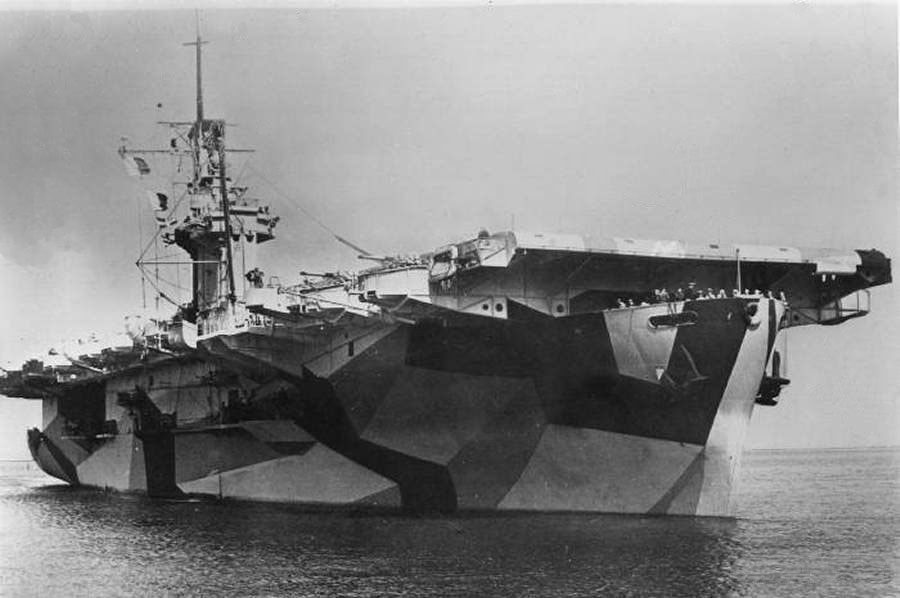
- USS St. Lo (CVE-63)

History

United States
- Name: Chapin Bay (1942–1943); Midway (1943–1944); St. Lo (1944)
- Namesake: Chapin Bay, Alaska; Battle of Midway; Battle of Saint-Lô
- Ordered: as a Type S4-S2-BB3 hull, MCE hull 1100
- Awarded: 18 June 1942
- Builder: Kaiser Vancouver, Vancouver, Washington
- Cost: $6,033,429.05
- Yard number: 309
- Way number: 3
- Laid down: 23 January 1943
- Launched: 17 August 1943
- Sponsored by: Mrs. Howard Nixon Coulter
- Commissioned: 23 October 1943
- Renamed: Midway, 3 April 1943; St. Lo, 10 October 1944
- Stricken: 27 November 1944
- Identification: Hull symbol: AVG-63; ACV-63; CVE-63
- Fate: Sunk by kamikaze aircraft, 25 October 1944

General characteristics
- Class & type: Casablanca-class escort carrier
- Displacement: 8,188 long tons (8,319 t) (standard); 10,902 long tons (11,077 t) (full load)
- Length: 512 ft 3 in (156.13 m) (oa); 490 ft (150 m) (wl); 474 ft (144 m) (fd)
- Beam: 65 ft 2 in (19.86 m); 108 ft (33 m) (extreme width)
- Draft: 20 ft 9 in (6.32 m) (max)
- Installed power: 4 × Babcock & Wilcox boilers; 9,000 shp (6,700 kW)
- Propulsion: 2 × Skinner Unaflow reciprocating steam engines; 2 × screws
- Speed: 19 knots (35 km/h; 22 mph)
- Range: 10,240 nmi (18,960 km; 11,780 mi) at 15 kn (28 km/h; 17 mph)
- Complement: Total:910–916 officers and men; Embarked Squadron:50–56; Ship's Crew:860
- Armament: 1 × 5 in (127 mm)/38 cal dual-purpose gun; 4 × twin 40 mm (1.57 in) Bofors anti-aircraft guns; 12 × 20 mm (0.79 in) Oerlikon anti-aircraft cannons
- Aircraft carried: 27 aircraft

Service record
- Part of: United States Pacific Fleet
- Operations: Battle of Saipan, Battle of Tinian, Battle of Morotai, Battle off Samar, Battle of Leyte Gulf
- Awards: Presidential Unit Citation, 4 Battle stars

USS St. Lo (AVG/ACV/CVE–63) was a Casablanca-class escort carrier of the United States Navy during World War II. On 25 October 1944, St. Lo became the first major warship to sink as the result of a kamikaze attack. The attack occurred during the Battle off Samar, part of the larger Battle of Leyte Gulf.

== Design and description ==
A side profile of the design of Thetis Bay.

St. Lo was a Casablanca-class escort carrier, the most numerous type of aircraft carriers ever built. Built to stem heavy losses during the Battle of the Atlantic, they came into service in late 1943, by which time the U-boat threat was already in retreat. Although some did see service in the Atlantic, the majority were utilized in the Pacific, ferrying aircraft, providing logistics support, and conducting close air support for the island-hopping campaigns. The Casablanca-class carriers were built on the standardized Type S4-S2-BB3 hull, a lengthened variant of the Doyen-class hull, and specifically designed to be mass-produced using welded prefabricated sections. This allowed them to be produced at unprecedented speeds: the final ship of her class, Munda, was delivered to the Navy just 101 days after the laying of her keel.

St. Lo was 512 ft 3 in (156.13 m) long overall (490 ft (150 m) at the waterline), had a beam of 65 ft 2 in (19.86 m), and a draft of 20 ft 9 in (6.32 m). She displaced 8,188 long tons (8,319 t) standard, which increased to 10,902 long tons (11,077 t) with a full load. To carry out flight operations, the ship had a 257 ft (78 m) hangar deck and a 474 ft (144 m) flight deck. Her compact size necessitated the installation of an aircraft catapult at her bow, and there were two aircraft elevators to facilitate movement of aircraft between the flight and hangar deck: one each fore and aft.

She was powered by four Babcock & Wilcox Express D boilers that raised 285 psi (1,970 kPa) of steam at 577 °F (303 °C). The steam generated by these boilers fed two Skinner Unaflow reciprocating steam engines, delivering 9,000 hp (6,700 kW) to two propeller shafts. This allowed her to reach speeds of 19 kn (35 km/h; 22 mph), with a cruising range of 10,240 nmi (18,960 km; 11,780 mi) at 15 kn (28 km/h; 17 mph). For armament, one 5 in (127 mm)/38 caliber dual-purpose gun was mounted on the stern. Additional anti-aircraft defense was provided by eight Bofors 40 mm (1.57 in) anti-aircraft guns in single mounts and twelve Oerlikon 20 mm (0.79 in) cannons mounted around the perimeter of the deck. Sensors onboard consisted of a SG surface-search radar and a SK air-search radar.

Although Casablanca-class escort carriers were intended to function with a crew of 860 and an embarked squadron of 50 to 56, the exigencies of wartime often necessitated the inflation of the crew count. They were designed to operate with 27 aircraft, but the hangar deck could accommodate much more during transport or training missions.

== Construction ==
St. Lo was laid down as Chapin Bay on 23 January 1943, under a Maritime Commission (MARCOM) contract, MC hull 1100; renamed Midway on 3 April 1943; launched on 17 August 1943; sponsored by Mrs Howard Nixon Coulter, commissioned on 23 October 1943.

== Service history ==
Midway left Astoria, Oregon on 13 November 1943. She went dry docking on 10 April 1944. After shakedown on the west coast and two voyages to Pearl Harbor and one to Australia, carrying replacement aircraft, Midway, with Composite Squadron 65 (VC-65) embarked, joined Rear Admiral Gerald F. Bogan's Carrier Support Group 1 in June, for the Mariana Islands. She provided air cover for the transports and participated in airstrikes on Saipan VC-65's FM-2 Wildcats claimed to have shot down four and damaged one other Japanese aircraft during combat air patrol operations there.

On 13 July, she sailed for Eniwetok, for replenishment before joining the attack on Tinian, on 23 July. Furnishing air support for ground forces on the island and maintaining an anti-submarine patrol, Midway operated off Tinian, until she again headed out for supplies on 28 July.

Midway remained at anchor in Eniwetok Atoll, until she got under way on 9 August, for Seeadler Harbor, at Manus, Admiralty Islands, arriving on 13 August.

On 13 September, she sortied with Task Force 77 (TF 77) for the invasion of Morotai. Launching her first aircraft to support the landings on 15 September. She continued to assist allied troops ashore and provide cover for the transports through 22 September.

After a refueling period, Midway resumed air operations in the Palaus until returning to Seeadler Harbor on 3 October. There, word arrived that the escort carrier had been renamed St. Lo, 10 October, to free the name Midway for a new attack carrier and to commemorate the Battle of Saint-Lô, on 18 July 1944.

=== Battle off Samar ===
St. Lo departed Seeadler Harbor on 12 October, to participate in the liberation of Leyte. Ordered to provide air coverage and close air support during the bombardment and amphibious landings, she arrived off Leyte on 18 October. She launched airstrikes in support of invasion operations at Tacloban, on the northeast coast of Leyte. Operating with Rear Admiral Clifton Sprague's escort carrier unit, "Taffy 3" (TU 77.4.3), which consisted of six escort carriers and a screen of three destroyers and four destroyer escorts, St. Lo steamed off the east coasts of Leyte and Samar and her aircraft sortied from 18 to 24 October, attacking enemy installations and airfields on Leyte and Samar islands.

Steaming about 60 mi (52 nmi; 97 km) east of Samar, before dawn of 25 October, St. Lo launched a four-aircraft anti-submarine patrol while the remaining carriers of Taffy 3 prepared for the day's initial airstrikes against the landing beaches. The Battle off Samar began at 06:47, when Ensign Bill Brooks – piloting one of the TBF Avengers from St. Lo – reported sighting a large Japanese force comprising four battleships, eight cruisers and twelve destroyers approaching from the west-northwest, only 17 mi (15 nmi; 27 km) away. At the same time, lookouts on St. Lo spotted the characteristic pagoda-like superstructures of Japanese battleships on the horizon. Rear Admiral Sprague ordered Taffy 3 to turn south at flank speed. But Vice Admiral Takeo Kurita's force opened fire at 06:58 on the slow, outnumbered and outgunned ships of Taffy 3.

St. Lo and the other five escort carriers dodged in and out of rain squalls and managed to launch all available fighter and torpedo aircraft with whatever armament they had available. Pilots were ordered, "to attack the Japanese task force and proceed to Tacloban airstrip, Leyte, to rearm and refuel" as the carriers managed to dodge salvos from enemy cruisers and battleships.

By 08:00, the enemy cruisers, approaching from St. Lo's port quarter, had closed to within 14,000 yd (13,000 m). St. Lo responded with fire from her single 5 in (127 mm) gun, claiming three hits on a Tone-class cruiser.

For the next 90 minutes, Admiral Kurita's ships closed in on Taffy 3, with his nearest destroyers and cruisers firing from as close as 10,000 yd (9,100 m) on the port and starboard quarters of St. Lo. Many salvos straddled the ship, landed close aboard, or passed directly overhead. Throughout the battle, the carriers and their escorts used smoke screens that Admiral Sprague credited with degrading Japanese gun accuracy. More effective were the attacks by the destroyers and destroyer escorts against the Japanese ships. All the while, Kurita's force was under attack by Taffy 3 aircraft and aircraft from the two other U.S. carrier units to the south.

Under attack from the air and fire from American destroyers and destroyer escorts, the enemy cruisers broke off the action and turned north at 09:20. At 09:15, the enemy destroyers which had been kept at bay by the exploits of USS Johnston, USS Hoel and USS Samuel B. Roberts as well as the other units of Taffy 3 – launched a premature torpedo attack from 10,500 yd (9,600 m). The torpedoes had nearly run out of fuel when they finally approached the escort carriers, broaching the surface. A St. Lo Avenger, piloted by Lieutenant, junior grade Tex Waldrop, strafed two torpedoes in the wake of USS Kalinin Bay.

=== Kamikaze ===
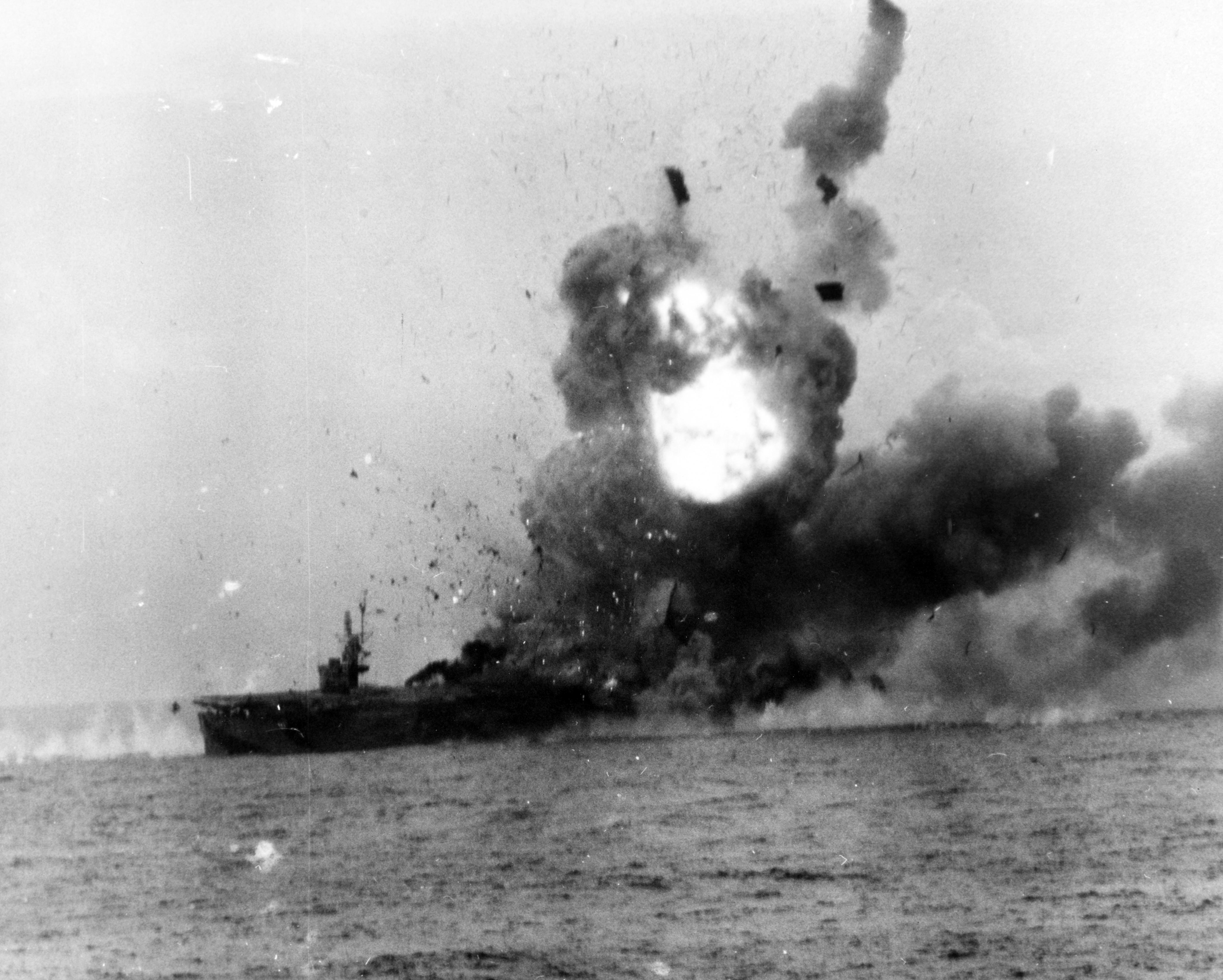
A kamikaze strikes St. Lo

At 10:50, the task unit came under a concentrated air attack by the Shikishima Special Attack Unit. During the forty-minute engagement with enemy kamikazes, all the escort carriers except USS Fanshaw Bay were damaged. One Mitsubishi A6M2 Zero – perhaps flown by Lieutenant Yukio Seki – crashed into the flight deck of St. Lo at 10:51. Seki was originally aiming to strike the carrier White Plains but damage from anti-aircraft fire made him change course to the St. Lo. Its bomb penetrated the flight deck and exploded on the port side of the hangar deck, where aircraft were in the process of being refueled and rearmed. A gasoline fire erupted, followed by secondary explosions, including detonations of the ship's torpedo and bomb magazine. St. Lo was engulfed in flame and sank 30 minutes later.

Of the 889 men aboard, 113 were killed or missing and approximately 30 others died of their wounds. The survivors were rescued from the water by USS Heermann, USS John C. Butler, USS Raymond and USS Dennis (which picked up 434 survivors).

The wreck is located near 11.02°N 126.04°E.

== Awards ==
- Presidential Unit Citation
- American Campaign Medal
- Asiatic-Pacific Medal with 4 awards
- World War II Victory Medal
- Philippine Presidential Unit Citation
- Philippine Liberation Medal

== Wreck ==
The wreck of St. Lo was found by RV Petrel on 14 May 2019 and surveyed on 25 May 2019. The main wreck sits upright in 4,736 meters (15,538 feet) of water, on the edge of the Philippine Trench.

== See also ==
- List of U.S. Navy losses in World War II

== Sources ==
- Cressman, Robert J. (19 February 2020). "Midway II (CVE-63)". Dictionary of American Naval Fighting Ships. Naval History and Heritage Command.
- "Kaiser Vancouver, Vancouver WA". ShipbuildingHistory.com. 27 November 2010.
- "USS Midway (CVE-63), later USS St. Lo (CVE-63)". NavSource. 10 December 2019.
- Gerhardt, Frank A. "Midway". U.S. Maritime Commission Database.
- "USS St. Lo (CVE-63) (+1944)". Wreck Site.

=== Bibliography ===
- Adcock, Al (1996), Escort Carriers in Action - Warships No. 9, Carrollton, Texas: Squadron/Signal Publications, ISBN 9780897473569
- Chesneau, Robert; Gardiner, Robert (1980), Conway's All the World's Fighting Ships 1922–1946, London, England: Naval Institute Press, ISBN 9780870219139
- Friedman, Norman (1983), U.S. Aircraft Carriers: An Illustrated Design History, Annapolis, Maryland: Naval Institute Press, ISBN 9780870217395
- Ross, Al (1993), The Escort Carrier Gambier Bay, Anatomy of the Ship, London, England: Conway Maritime Press, ISBN 9781557502353
- Smith, Peter C (2014). Kamikaze: To Die for the Emperor. Barnsley, UK: Pen & Sword Books. ISBN 9781781593134.
- Y'Blood, William (2012), The Little Giants: U.S. Escort Carriers Against Japan, Annapolis, Maryland: Naval Institute Press, ISBN 9781612512471
