= Kaliningrad (disambiguation) =

Kaliningrad is a Baltic port city in Kaliningrad Oblast, Russia.

Kaliningrad may also refer to:

- Kaliningrad Oblast, a federal subject of Russia
- Kaliningrad Special Region, a military district of the Russian Armed Forces which existed in 1997–2010
- Kaliningrad, name of the city of Korolyov, Russia between 1938 and 1996
- Kaliningrad Railway, a subsidiary of the Russian Railways
- Kaliningrad K-5 (missile), a model of Soviet air-to-air missile
- Kaliningrad K-8 (missile), a model of Soviet air-to-air missile
- Russian landing ship Kaliningrad, a Ropucha-class landing ship in the Russian Navy

== See also ==
- Kaliningradsky (disambiguation)
