= USS Raymond (DE-341) =

US World War II destroyer escort

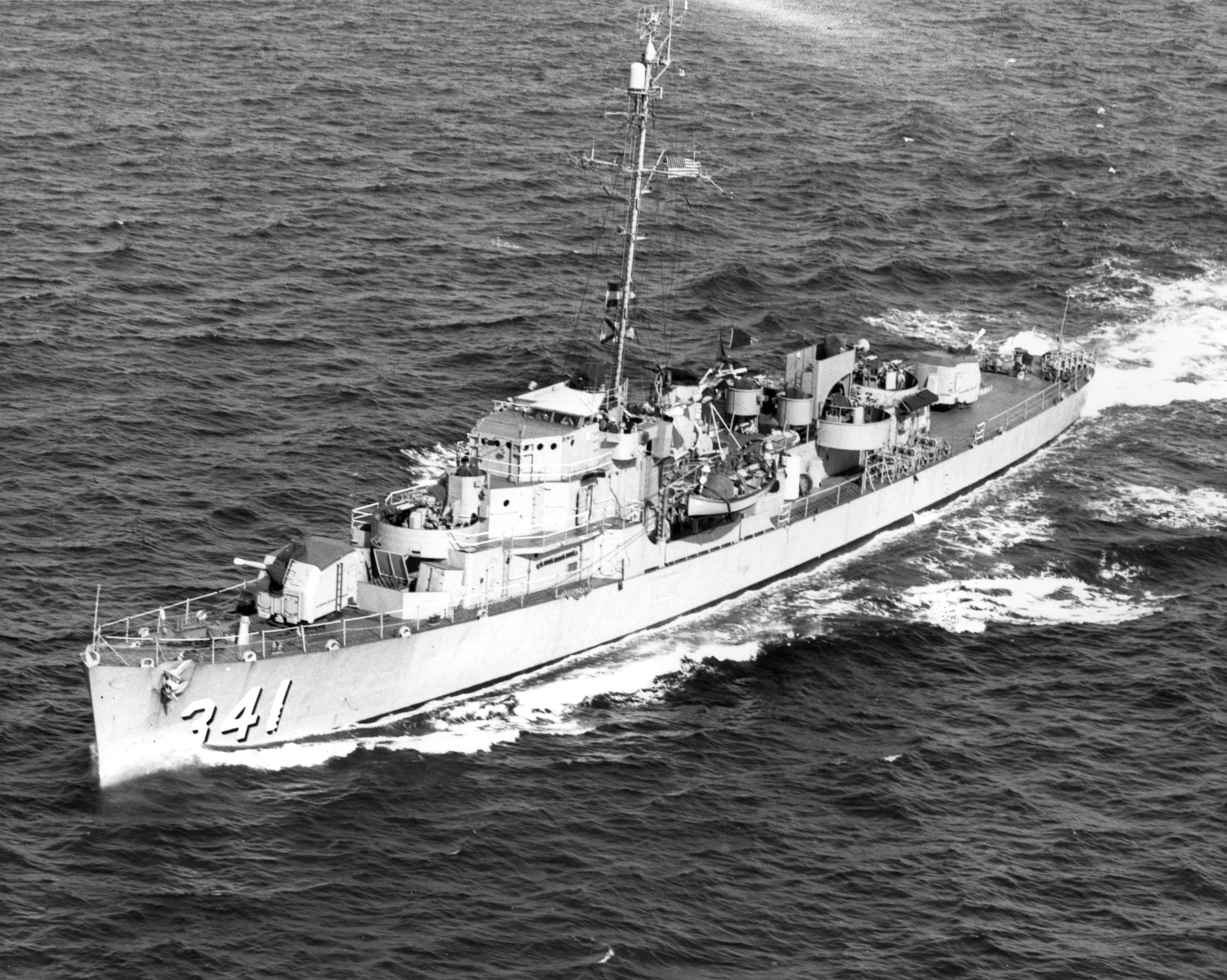
- USS Raymond (DE-341) underway, c. the 1950s

History

United States
- Name: Raymond
- Namesake: Reginald Marbury Raymond
- Builder: Consolidated Steel Corporation, Orange, Texas
- Laid down: 3 November 1943
- Launched: 8 January 1944
- Commissioned: 15 April 1944
- Decommissioned: 22 September 1958
- Out of service: 31 May 1960
- Stricken: 1 July 1972
- Honors and awards: Presidential Unit Citation; 5 battle stars for World War II
- Fate: Sunk as target off Florida on 22 January 1974

General characteristics
- Class & type: John C. Butler-class destroyer escort
- Displacement: 1,350 long tons (1,372 t)
- Length: 306 ft (93 m)
- Beam: 36 ft 8 in (11.18 m)
- Draft: 9 ft 5 in (2.87 m)
- Propulsion: 2 boilers; 2 geared turbine engines; 12,000 shp (8,900 kW); 2 propellers
- Speed: 24 knots (44 km/h; 28 mph)
- Range: 6,000 nmi (11,000 km; 6,900 mi) at 12 kn (22 km/h; 14 mph)
- Complement: 186
- Armament: 2 × single 5 in (127 mm) guns; 2 × twin 40 mm (1.6 in) AA guns; 10 × single 20 mm (0.79 in) AA guns; 1 × triple 21 in (533 mm) torpedo tubes; 8 × depth charge throwers; 1 × Hedgehog ASW mortar; 2 × depth charge racks

USS Raymond (DE-341) was a John C. Butler-class destroyer escort acquired by the U.S. Navy during World War II. The purpose of the destroyer escort was primarily to escort and protect ships in convoy, in addition to other tasks as assigned, such as patrol or radar picket. Post-war, she returned home with five battle stars to her credit, including credit for her striking a Japanese cruiser with her 5-inch (127 mm) guns during the Battle off Samar. The destroyer escort was named for Reginald Marbury Raymond, who was killed by enemy gunfire on 30 April 1943 aboard USS Scorpion.

The second Navy ship to be named Raymond, she was laid down by Consolidated Steel Corp. at their yard in Orange, Texas on 3 November 1943 and launched on 8 January 1944, sponsored by Mrs. Helen Raymond. The ship was commissioned on 15 April 1944.

== History ==
=== World War II ===
==== 1944 ====
Following shakedown off Bermuda, Raymond served as training ship for the Norfolk Training Station, then steamed on 1 July for the Panama Canal. She arrived at Pearl Harbor on 23 July, and got underway on 12 August for Guadalcanal and Manus Island. Arriving at the latter on 28 August, she joined the escort carrier group staging for the Morotai assault. On 15 September, she screened the escort carriers attacking Morotai in the Netherlands East Indies. After returning to Manus, she supported air operations on 16 October against Leyte, Philippine Islands.

On 25 October, she participated in the Battle off Samar during which she attacked Japanese ships, inflicting damage to a Japanese cruiser with her 5-inch guns. Shortly after the battle, she picked up survivors from the escort carrier St. Lo, which was sunk by a kamikaze.

==== 1945 ====
Returning to Manus and Pearl Harbor, she left the latter port on 29 December and arrived at Eniwetok on 7 January 1945. She then performed escort duty to Saipan and Tinian, and on 9 February was underway with Task Unit 50.8.24 (TU 50.8.24) to refuel Task Force 58 (TF 58) prior to the Iwo Jima assault. As part of the antisubmarine screen for TU 50.8.24, Raymond supported the Iwo Jima campaign, arriving off Guam en route to Ulithi on 3 March.

On 21 March, she sortied with TU 50.18.34, bound for Kerama Retto, Okinawa. During Operation Iceberg, Raymond performed escort and screening duties until mid-May 1945. She then resumed convoy escort duties and for the remainder of the war steamed between the Caroline and Ryukyu Islands.

=== Post-War ===
Raymond served in occupied Japanese waters from 2–6 September, then returned to the United States, and in November entered the Pacific Reserve Fleet.

Decommissioned on 24 January 1947, Raymond was berthed at San Diego, California, until recommissioned on 27 April 1951. She transited the Panama Canal and arrived Newport, Rhode Island on 11 August 1951. Local operations along the New England coast, exercises in the Caribbean and duty with the Fleet Sonar School at Key West, Florida kept her in the western Atlantic until the summer of 1953, when she conducted a midshipman training cruise to Scandinavia.

Returning to Newport for local operations on 1 September, she resumed her previous schedule and, interrupting them only for a second midshipman cruise, in the summer of 1954, continued operations off the eastern seaboard and in the Caribbean until 22 September 1958.

She was then decommissioned and placed in service. She continued her operations off the east coast into 1959. Placed in reserve on 31 May 1960 and berthed at Philadelphia, Pennsylvania, she was struck from the Naval Vessel Register on 1 July 1972.

== Awards ==
Raymond earned five battle stars for World War II service and the Presidential Unit Citation for heroism in the Battle off Samar.
