= Poselok Imeni Kalinina =

- Location within Armenia Location within Ararat
- Coordinates: 40°00′34″N 44°25′58″E
- Country: Armenia
- Marz (Province): Ararat
- Time zone: UTC+4 ( )

Poselok Imeni Kalinina (also, Posëlok Imeni Kalinina) is an abandoned village in the Ararat Province of Armenia.

== See also ==
- Ararat Province
