= USS Dennis =

John C. Butler-class destroyer escort

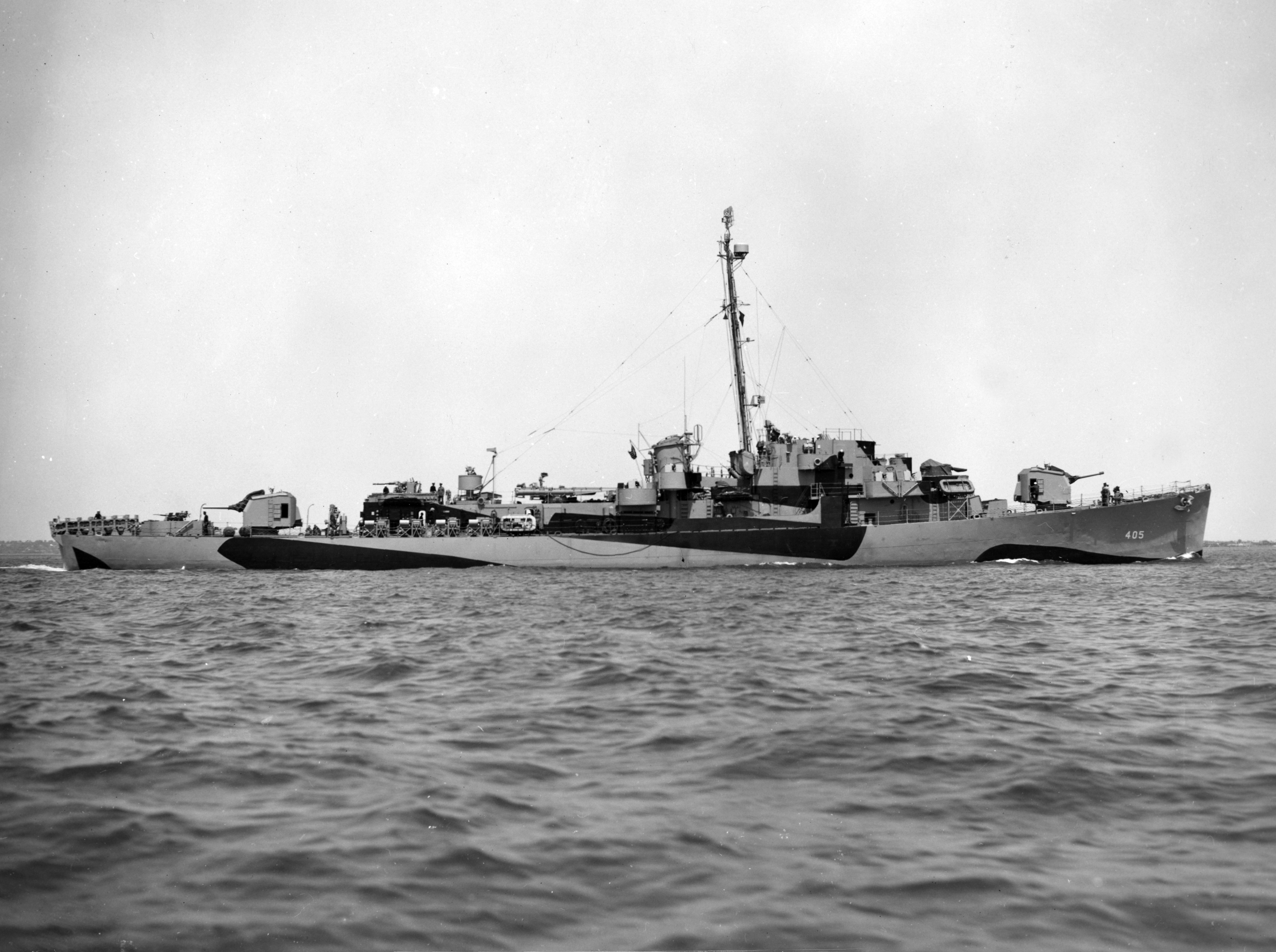
- USS Dennis (DE-405) on 20 May 1944

History

United States
- Name: USS Dennis
- Namesake: Otis Lee Dennis
- Builder: Brown Shipbuilding, Houston, Texas
- Laid down: 15 September 1943
- Launched: 4 December 1943
- Commissioned: 20 March 1944
- Decommissioned: 31 May 1946
- Stricken: 1 December 1972
- Fate: Sold for scrapping, 12 September 1973

General characteristics
- Class & type: John C. Butler-class destroyer escort
- Displacement: 1,350 long tons (1,370 t)
- Length: 306 ft (93 m)
- Beam: 36 ft 8 in (11.18 m)
- Draft: 9 ft 5 in (2.87 m)
- Installed power: 12,000 shp (8,900 kW)
- Propulsion: 2 × geared steam turbines; 2 × boilers; 2 × shafts
- Speed: 24 knots (44 km/h; 28 mph)
- Range: 6,000 nmi (6,900 mi; 11,000 km) at 12 kn (22 km/h; 14 mph)
- Complement: 14 officers, 201 enlisted
- Armament: 2 × single 5 in (127 mm) guns; 2 × twin 40 mm (1.6 in) AA guns; 10 × single 20 mm (0.79 in) AA guns; 1 × triple 21 in (533 mm) torpedo tubes; 8 × depth charge throwers; 1 × Hedgehog ASW mortar; 2 × depth charge racks

USS Dennis (DE-405) was a John C. Butler-class destroyer escort in the service with the United States Navy from 1944 to 1946. She was scrapped in 1973.

== History ==
Dennis was named after Radioman Third Class Otis Lee Dennis was born in Scottsville, Allen County, Kentucky on 25 March 1913. He was killed in action 1 February 1942 with Carleton Thayer Fogg (namesake of Fogg) when their Douglas SBD Dauntless was lost during an attack launched by Enterprise on Roi-Namur, Kwajalein. It was one of the first offensive operations following Pearl Harbor.

Dennis was launched on 4 December 1943 by Brown Shipbuilding, in Houston, Texas; sponsored by Mrs. J. L. Dennis, mother of the late Radioman Third Class Dennis; and commissioned on 20 March 1944.

Dennis differed from most ships in her class in that she had a quadruple mount and a twin mount of Bofors 40 mm (1.6 in) guns instead of two twin mounts. This represented a 50% increase in medium anti-aircraft guns.

=== Pacific War ===
Dennis arrived at Pearl Harbor on 19 June 1944 to escort a convoy to Eniwetok and Kwajalein. She returned to Eniwetok on 29 July screening the light carrier Belleau Wood. Joining the 5th Fleet, she escorted Carrier Division 22 to Manus for exercises, then sortied with Task Force 77 on 10 September to supply air support for the landings on Morotai Island from 15 to 27 September.

From 12 October, Dennis screened the escort carriers supplying the air cover for the invasion of Leyte. On 25 October, she joined her carriers in making history as they fought a gallant action with the Japanese counter-attacking force in the Battle off Samar phase of the Battle of Leyte Gulf. Dennis was positioned alone as the final destroyer escort between the screen of destroyers and destroyers escorts and the escort carriers being shielded. Dennis was credited with torpedoing and sinking a Japanese heavy cruiser in that action. Dennis rescued 434 survivors from the escort carrier St. Lo, which had been sunk by a kamikaze. For this action, she shared in the Presidential Unit Citation awarded to TU 77.4.3, "Taffy 3". Arriving at Kossol Roads, Palaus on 28 October, she sailed three days later for the west coast, arriving at San Francisco, California on 26 November for an overhaul.

Returning to the forward area Dennis departed Guam on 16 February 1945 for the invasion of Iwo Jima, patrolling off the island until 8 March, when she sailed to escort a convoy to Ulithi. On 21 March, she proceeded to join a carrier group launching air strikes in preparation for the invasion of Okinawa. She remained with the carriers as they gave close support to the invasion forces ashore. On 4 May, she rescued 88 of the crew of the escort carrier Sangamon, a kamikaze victim. She served on radar picket duty at Ulithi from 9 May-3 June, then returned to Okinawa to join the Third Fleet for strikes against the Japanese mainland until 26 June.

From 30 June 1945 until the end of the war, Dennis escorted convoys among Ulithi, Okinawa, the Philippines, and New Guinea. After the war, she escorted landing craft to Okinawa, then departed Leyte Gulf on 14 October for the west coast, arriving at San Diego, California on 6 November. She was placed out of commission in reserve there on 31 May 1946.

== Honors ==
In addition to her Presidential Unit Citation, Dennis received four battle stars for World War II service.
