= Kalininsk, Russia =

Kalininsk (Russian: Кали́нинск) is the name of several inhabited localities in Russia.

Urban localities

- Kalininsk, Saratov Oblast, a town in Kalininsky District of Saratov Oblast

Rural localities

- Kalininsk, Tomsk Oblast, a settlement under the administrative jurisdiction of the town of Kedrovy, Tomsk Oblast
