= Burunqovaq =

- Municipality
- Location within Azerbaijan
- Coordinates: 41°05′39″N 46°26′25″E
- Country: Azerbaijan
- Rayon: Samukh

Population
  - Total: 379
- Time zone: UTC+4 (AZT)
  - Summer (DST): UTC+5 (AZT)

Burunqovaq (also, Burunkovag, Burunkovak, Burunkovakh, and Kalinin) is a village and municipality in the Samukh Rayon of Azerbaijan. It has a population of 379.
