= USS Kalinin Bay =

Casablanca-class escort carrier of the U.S. Navy

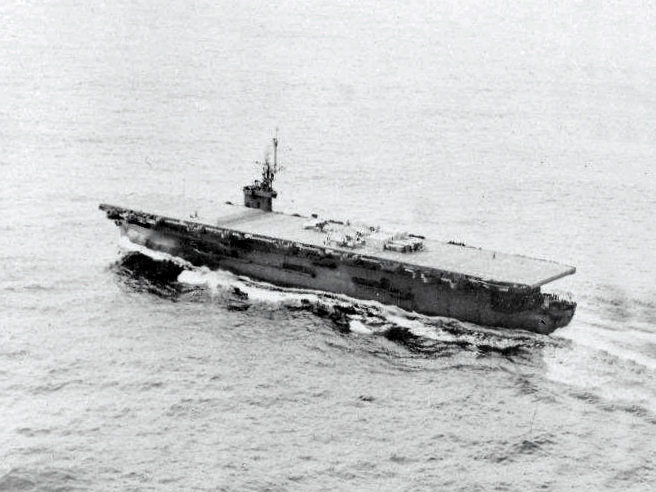
- USS Kalinin Bay

History

United States
- Name: Kalinin Bay
- Builder: Kaiser Shipyards
- Laid down: 26 April 1943
- Launched: 15 October 1943
- Commissioned: 27 November 1943
- Decommissioned: 15 May 1946
- Fate: Sold for scrap 8 December 1946

General characteristics
- Class & type: Casablanca-class escort carrier
- Displacement: 7,800 tons
- Length: 512 ft 3 in (156.13 m) overall
- Beam: 65 ft 2 in (19.86 m); 108 ft (33 m) maximum width
- Draft: 22 ft 6 in (6.86 m)
- Propulsion: 2 × 5-cylinder reciprocating Skinner Unaflow engines; 4 × 285 psi boilers; 2 shafts, 9,000 shp (6,700 kW)
- Speed: 19 knots (35 km/h)
- Range: 10,240 nmi (18,960 km) at 15 kn (28 km/h)
- Complement: 860 officers and men; Embarked Squadron: 50 to 56 officers and men; Total: 910 to 916 officers and men.
- Armament: 1 × 5-inch/38 cal DP gun; 16 × 40 mm AA cannon in 8 twin mounts; 20 × 20 mm guns AA machine guns in single mounts
- Aircraft carried: 27

Service record
- Part of: United States Pacific Fleet
- Operations: Gilbert and Marshall Islands campaign; Mariana and Palau Islands campaign; Battle off Samar; Operation Magic Carpet
- Awards: Presidential Unit Citation; 5 Battle stars

USS Kalinin Bay (CVE-68) was a Casablanca-class escort carrier of the United States Navy.

She originally designated an AVG, was classified ACV-68 on 20 August 1942; laid down under a United States Maritime Commission contract 26 April 1943 by the Kaiser Shipbuilding Co., Inc., Vancouver, Washington; reclassified CVE-68 on 15 July 1943; launched 15 October 1943; sponsored by Mrs. Anna Mary Updegraff, mother of Captain William N. Updegraff, U.S. Navy; and commissioned 27 November at Astoria, Oregon, Captain C. R. Brown in command.

USS Kalinin Bay was named after a bay on the northern shore of Kruzof Island in the Alexander Archipelago of southeastern Alaska.

== Design and description ==
A side profile of the design of Thetis Bay.

Kalinin Bay was a Casablanca-class escort carrier, the most numerous type of aircraft carriers ever built. Built to stem heavy losses during the Battle of the Atlantic, they came into service in late 1943, by which time the U-boat threat was already in retreat. Although some did see service in the Atlantic, the majority were utilized in the Pacific, ferrying aircraft, providing logistics support, and conducting close air support for the island-hopping campaigns. The Casablanca-class carriers were built on the standardized Type S4-S2-BB3 hull, a lengthened variant of the Doyen-class hull, and specifically designed to be mass-produced using welded prefabricated sections. This allowed them to be produced at unprecedented speeds: the final ship of her class, Munda, was delivered to the Navy just 101 days after the laying of her keel.

Kalinin Bay was 512 ft 3 in (156.13 m) long overall (490 ft (150 m) at the waterline), had a beam of 65 ft 2 in (19.86 m), and a draft of 20 ft 9 in (6.32 m). She displaced 8,188 long tons (8,319 t) standard, which increased to 10,902 long tons (11,077 t) with a full load. To carry out flight operations, the ship had a 257 ft (78 m) hangar deck and a 474 ft (144 m) flight deck. Her compact size necessitated the installation of an aircraft catapult at her bow, and there were two aircraft elevators to facilitate movement of aircraft between the flight and hangar deck: one each fore and aft.

She was powered by four Babcock & Wilcox Express D boilers that raised 285 psi (1,970 kPa) of steam at 577 °F (303 °C). The steam generated by these boilers fed two Skinner Unaflow reciprocating steam engines, delivering 9,000 hp (6,700 kW) to two propeller shafts. This allowed her to reach speeds of 19 kn (35 km/h; 22 mph), with a cruising range of 10,240 nmi (18,960 km; 11,780 mi) at 15 kn (28 km/h; 17 mph). For armament, one 5 in (127 mm)/38 caliber dual-purpose gun was mounted on the stern. Additional anti-aircraft defense was provided by eight Bofors 40 mm (1.57 in) anti-aircraft guns in single mounts and twelve Oerlikon 20 mm (0.79 in) cannons mounted around the perimeter of the deck. By 1945, Casablanca-class carriers had been modified to carry twenty Oerlikon cannons and sixteen Bofors guns; the doubling of the latter was accomplished by putting them into twin mounts. Sensors onboard consisted of a SG surface-search radar and a SK air-search radar.

Although Casablanca-class escort carriers were intended to function with a crew of 860 and an embarked squadron of 50 to 56, the exigencies of wartime often necessitated the inflation of the crew count. They were designed to operate with 27 aircraft, but the hangar deck could accommodate much more during transport or training missions.

== Service history ==
After shakedown along the Pacific Coast, Kalinin Bay departed San Diego 3 January 1944 for replenishment duty in the Pacific. Laden with troops and a cargo of planes, she steamed via Pearl Harbor for the Gilbert Islands, arriving off Tarawa Atoll 24 January to supply 5th Fleet carriers then engaged in the conquest of the Marshalls. For more than two weeks she provided logistic support from Tarawa to Majuro Atoll before returning to Alameda, California, 24 February.

=== Gilbert and Marshall Islands Campaign ===
With Composite Squadron 3 (VC-3) embarked 9 April, Kalinin Bay reached Majuro, Marshalls, 23 April; conducted ASW air patrols off Mili Atoll; and proceeded to Pearl Harbor 1 May to prepare for the Marianas operation. She departed Pearl Harbor 30 May; and, while en route to Saipan, she successfully evaded a Japanese torpedo that crossed her bow close aboard. Touching at Eniwetok 9 June, Kalinin Bay reached the eastern coast of Saipan 15 June and commenced air operations in support of the invasion. After repelling an enemy air attack at dusk on the 17th, she sailed 19 June to ferry planes to and from Eniwetok. Returning to Saipan 24 June, she resumed effective air strikes against enemy positions on the embattled island until 9 July when she steamed via Eniwetok for similar duty at Guam. Arriving 20 July, she launched direct support and ASW sorties until 2 August, then returned to Eniwetok to prepare for operations in the Palau Islands.

=== Mariana and Palau Islands Campaign ===
Kalinin Bay cleared Eniwetok 18 August and proceeded via Tulagi, Florida Island, to the Southern Palaus where she arrived 14 September with units of the 3rd Fleet. Ordered to furnish air support for the capture, occupation, and defense of Peleliu, Angaur, and Ngesebus, she launched air strikes to support landing operations. For 2 weeks her planes, flying almost 400 sorties, inflicted heavy damage on enemy ground installations and shipping. On 25 September, alone, they sank or destroyed three cargo transports and six landing barges.

=== Philippines Campaign ===
She departed the Palaus 30 September; and, upon arriving Seeadler Harbor, Manus Island, 3 October, she received a new commanding officer, Captain T. B. Williamson. Kalinin Bay departed Manus 12 October en route to the Philippine Islands. Ordered to provide air coverage and close air support during the bombardment and amphibious landings on Leyte Island, she arrived off Leyte 17 October. After furnishing air support during landings by Ranger units on Dinagat and Homonhon Islands in the eastern approaches to Leyte Gulf, she launched air strikes in support of invasion operations at Tacloban on the northeast coast of Leyte. Operating with Rear Admiral Clifton Sprague's "Taffy 3" (Task Unit 77.4.3), which consisted of 6 escort carriers and a screen of 3 destroyers and 4 destroyer escorts, Kalinin Bay sailed to the east of Leyte and Samar as her planes, flying 244 sorties from 18 to 24 October, struck and destroyed enemy installations and airfields on Leyte, Samar, Cebu, Negros, and Panay Islands.

=== The Battle off Samar ===
Steaming about 60 miles east of Samar before dawn 25 October, Taffy 3 prepared to launch the day's initial air strikes. At 6:47, Rear Admiral Sprague received word that a sizable Japanese fleet was approaching from the northwest. Comprising four battleships, eight cruisers, and eleven destroyers, Vice Admiral Takeo Kurita's Center Force steadily closed and at 0658 opened fire on Taffy 3.

This engagement initiated the Battle off Samar. Although the ships of the U.S. task unit, Taffy 3, were slower and heavily outnumbered by the Japanese force, they engaged the advancing fleet.

Kalinin Bay accelerated to flank speed, and, despite fire from three enemy cruisers, she launched her planes, ordering the pilots "to attack the Japanese task force and proceed to Tacloban airstrip, Leyte, to rearm and regas." As salvos fell "with disconcerting rapidity" increasingly nearer Kalinin Bay, her planes, striking the enemy force with bombs, rockets, and gunfire, inflicted heavy damage on the closing ships.

==== Coming under heavy fire ====
As the trailing ship in the escort caravan, Kalinin Bay came under intense enemy fire. Though partially protected by chemical smoke, by a timely rain squall, and by valiant counterattacks of screening destroyers and destroyer escorts, she took the first of 15 direct hits at 7:50. At 17,000 yards, the Japanese battleship Haruna fired two salvos from her main guns at Kalinin Bay, and her second salvo landed a 14-inch (356 mm) shell which struck the starboard side of the hangar deck just abaft of the forward elevator. Sailors recovered fragments of the large caliber shell on the hangar deck.

By 8:00, the Japanese heavy cruiser Haguro was spotted steaming off Kalinin Bay's port quarter as they closed to 18,000 yards and opened fire, shortly joined by the heavy cruiser Tone. Kalinin Bay was hit by three 8-inch (203 mm) armor-piercing shells, two hitting the stern and one hitting the bow, while Kalinin Bay responded with her single 5-inch (127 mm) gun and landed a pair of hits to the Haguro. One 5-inch (127 mm) shell destroyed Haguro's radio transmitter while the other cut her communication tables. At 8:25, Haguro was hit by a pair of 100-pound bombs which caused her to drop out of formation while Tone followed her. Kalinin Bay's gunners claimed credit for this damage.

However, salvation did not come as at 8:30, the light cruiser Yahagi leading the destroyers Yukikaze, Isokaze, Urakaze, and Nowaki steamed over the horizon off her starboard quarter and closed to 15,000 yards and fired a spread of 24 torpedoes, some of which came dangerously close to hitting the carrier until fighters destroyed them with strafing runs. However, immediately afterwards Haguro and Tone recommenced firing on Kalinin Bay, and to great effect. Most of next eleven 8-inch (203 mm) shell hits were scored after 08:40 when Tone and Haguro closed to 10,100 yards. Many hits passed through the flight deck and hangar bay, starting a large fire, while near misses flooded seawater into the ship. Most dangerously, the first of these 8-inch (203 mm) shells holed Kalinin Bay below the waterline, passed through the ship, and detonated after coming out the other side and hitting the water, effectively acting as both a hit and near miss. This shell disabled the ship's fuel lines, shredded her forward bulkhead, and put the ship in serious danger. Another shell passed through the flight deck and into the communications area, where it destroyed all the radar and radio equipment.

Tone and Haguro switched fire to USS Fanshaw Bay at 8:55. At 9:15, Yahagi and her destroyers, which were kept at bay by the daring and almost single-handed exploits of the destroyer USS Johnston which they proceeded to sink with gunfire, launched a premature torpedo attack from 10,500 yards. As the torpedoes approached the escort carriers, they slowed down. A Grumman TBF Avenger from St. Lo strafed and exploded two torpedoes in Kalinin Bay's wake about 100 yards astern, and a shell from the latter's 5 inch gun deflected a third from a collision course with her stern.

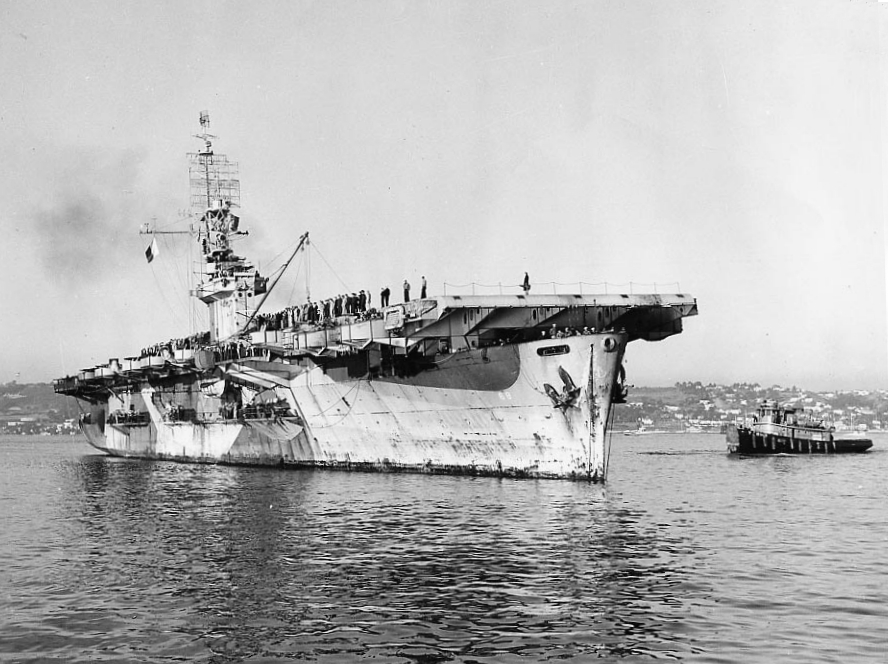
Kalinin Bay arriving in San Diego following her engagement off Samar.

At about 9:30, as the enemy ships fired parting salvos and reversed course northward, Kalinin Bay scored a direct hit amidships on a retreating destroyer. Five minutes later, she ceased fire and retired southward with the surviving ships of Taffy 3. At 10:50, the task unit came under a concentrated air attack. During the 40-minute battle, the first attack from a Kamikaze unit in World War II, all except Fanshaw Bay were damaged. One plane of Lieutenant Yukio Seki and his Shikishima squadron crashed through St. Lo's flight deck and exploded her torpedo and bomb magazine, mortally wounding the carrier. Four diving planes attacked Kalinin Bay from astern and the starboard quarter. Intense fire splashed two close aboard; but a third plane crashed into the port side of the flight deck, damaging it badly. The fourth hit destroyed the aft port stack.

As part of Taffy 3, Kalinin Bay had prevented a Japanese penetration into Leyte Gulf and saved General Douglas MacArthur's beachhead in the Philippines. At a cost of five ships and 1,161 men, Taffy 3, aided by her own planes and those of "Taffy 2" (Task Unit 77.4.2), sank three enemy cruisers, seriously damaged several other ships, and turned back the "most powerful surface fleet which Japan had sent to sea since the Battle of Midway."

Despite the battle damage, Taffy 3 cleared the air of attacking planes; at noon, the escort carriers retired southeastward while their escort searched for survivors from St. Lo. Though Kalinin Bay suffered extensive structural damage during the morning's furious action, she counted only 5 dead among her 60 casualties. Weary and battle scarred, Kalinin Bay was awarded the Presidential Unit Citation for heroic conduct as a unit of Taffy 3. She steamed via Woendi, Schouten Islands, to Manus, arriving 1 November for emergency repairs. Getting under way for the United States 7 November, the escort carrier reached San Diego 27 November for permanent repairs and alterations.

== End of career ==
Repairs completed 18 January 1945, the veteran escort carrier departed San Diego 20 January to ferry planes and men to Pearl Harbor and Guam. For more than 8 months, she served as a replenishment carrier in the Pacific Carrier Transport Squadron; and, during six cruises between the West Coast and Pearl Harbor, Eniwetok, and Guam, she transported more than 600 planes. Departing San Diego 2 September, she steamed to the Philippines, arriving at Samar 28 September to participate in Operation Magic Carpet. With 1,048 men embarked, she departed Samar 1 October and arrived San Francisco 19 October.

After conducting two more voyages between California and Pearl Harbor, Kalinin Bay departed San Diego 8 December for the Far East. On 25 December, while she steamed to Yokosuka, Japan, an intense storm heavily damaged her flight deck. Arriving the 27th, she received emergency repairs, then sailed 3 January 1946 for the West Coast and arrived San Diego 17 January. On 13 February, she proceeded to the eastern seaboard, reaching Boston 9 March. Kalinin Bay was decommissioned 15 May, and she was sold for scrap 8 December to Patapsco Steel Co., Baltimore, Maryland.

== Awards ==
In addition to the Presidential Unit Citation, Kalinin Bay received five battle stars for World War II service.
