= Kalininskoye, Republic of Bashkortostan =

Kalininskoye Калининское
- Village
- Location within Bashkortostan Location within Russia
- Coordinates: 54°40′N 56°31′E
- Country: Russia
- Region: Bashkortostan
- District: Iglinsky District
- Time zone: UTC+5:00

Kalininskoye (Russian: Калининское) is a rural locality (a village) in Kaltymanovsky Selsoviet, Iglinsky District, Bashkortostan, Russia. The population was 9 as of 2010. There are 3 streets.

== Geography ==
Kalininskoye is located 27 km southeast of Iglino (the district's administrative centre) by road. Pushkinskoye is the nearest rural locality.
