= Kaliningradsky =

Kaliningradsky (masculine), Kaliningradskaya (feminine), or Kaliningradskoye (neuter) may refer to:

- Kaliningrad economic region, one of twelve economic regions of Russia
- Kaliningrad Oblast (Kaliningradskaya Oblast), a federal subject of Russia
- Kaliningradskaya (brand), a Russian brand of vodka
