= Kalininskaya, Krasnodar Krai =

Kalininskaya Калининская
- Stanitsa
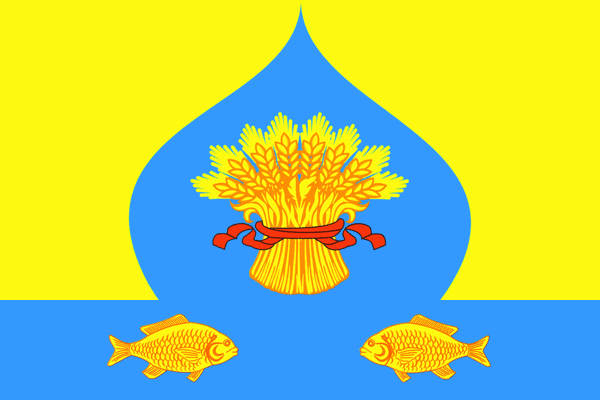
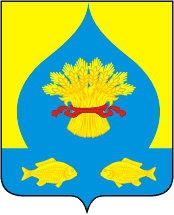
- Flag Coat of arms
- Interactive map of Kalininskaya
- Location of Kalininskaya Kalininskaya (Krasnodar Krai)
- Coordinates: 45°29′04″N 38°39′55″E
- Country: Russia
- Federal subject: Krasnodar Krai
- Administrative district: Kalininsky District
- Founded: 1794
- Elevation: 6 m (20 ft)

Population (2010 Census)
  - Total: 13,391
  - Estimate (2023): 14,035 (+4.8%)

Administrative status
  - Capital of: Kalininsky District
- Time zone: UTC+3 (MSK)
- Postal code: 353780
- OKTMO ID: 03619420101

Kalininskaya (Russian: Кали́нинская) is a rural locality (a stanitsa) and the administrative center of Kalininsky District of Krasnodar Krai, Russia, located on the Beysug River. Population: 13,391 (2010 census); 13,192 (2002 census); 11,263 (1989 Soviet census).
