= Kalininsky District, Krasnodar Krai =

Kalininsky District Калининский район (Russian)
- District
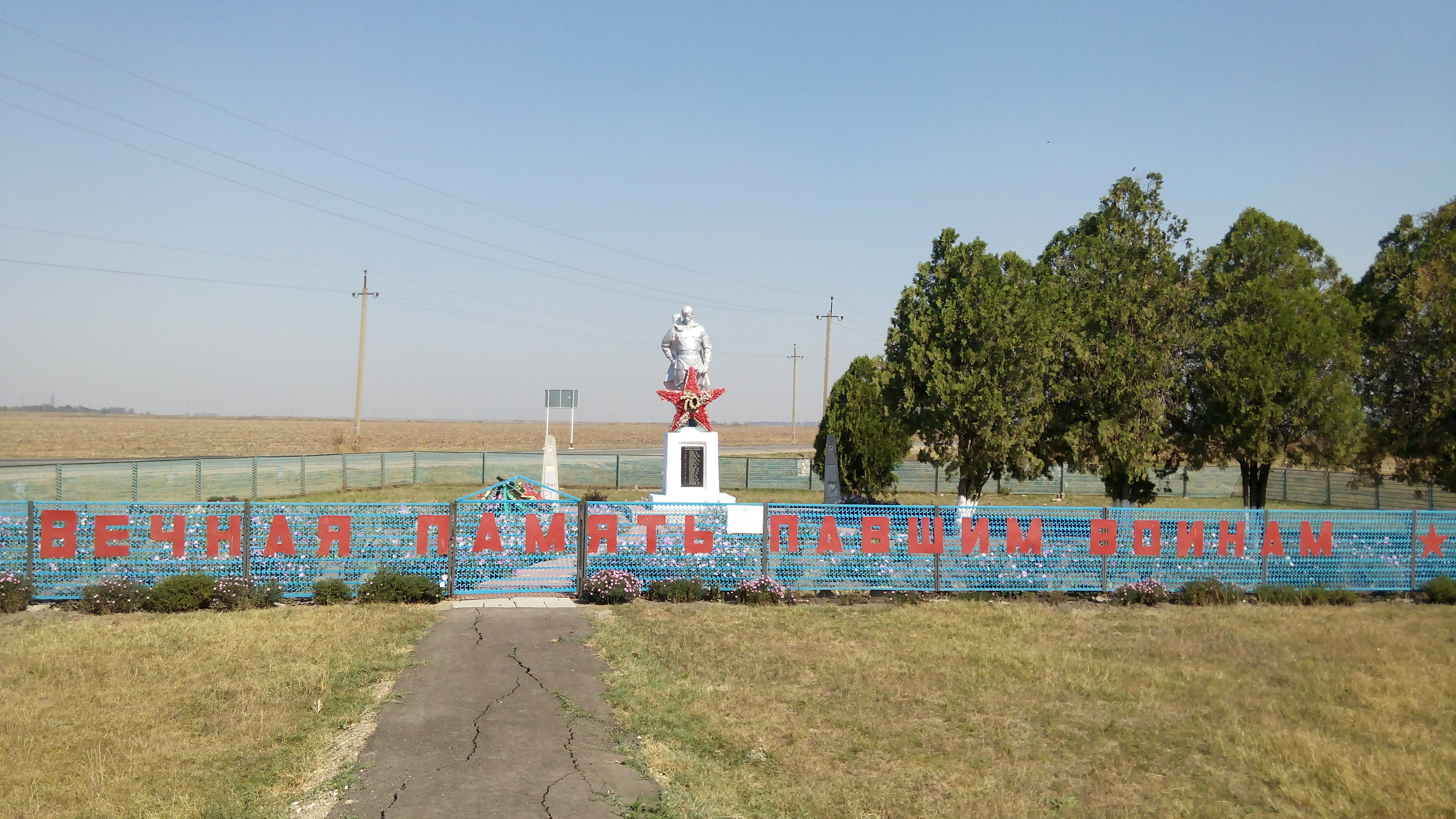
- Mass grave of 181 Russian soldiers, Novonikolaevsk village, Kalininsky District

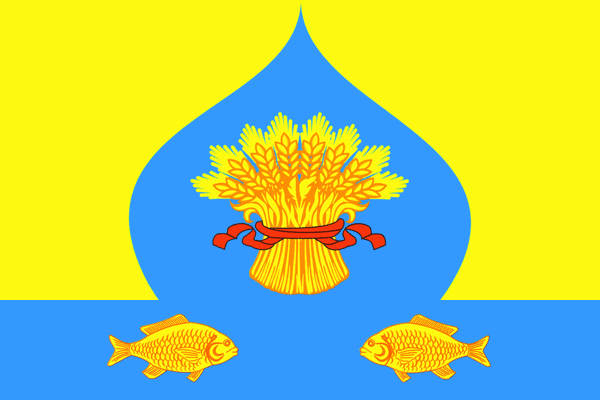
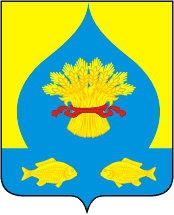
- Flag Coat of arms
- Location of Kalininsky District in Krasnodar Krai
- Coordinates: 45°29′23″N 38°40′30″E
- Country: Russia
- Federal subject: Krasnodar Krai
- Established: 19 July 1924
- Administrative center: Kalininskaya

Area
  - Total: 1,499 km^{2} (579 sq mi)

Population (2010 Census)
  - Total: 50,691
  - Density: 33.82/km^{2} (87.58/sq mi)
  - Urban: 0%
  - Rural: 100%

Administrative structure
  - Administrative divisions: 8 Rural okrugs
  - Inhabited localities: 27 rural localities

Municipal structure
  - Municipally incorporated as: Kalininsky Municipal District
  - Municipal divisions: 0 urban settlements, 8 rural settlements
- Time zone: UTC+3 (MSK)
- OKTMO ID: 03619000
- Website: https://krasnodar.ru/content/40/show/34757/

Kalininsky District (Russian: Кали́нинский райо́н) is an administrative district (raion), one of the thirty-eight in Krasnodar Krai, Russia. As a municipal division, it is incorporated as Kalininsky Municipal District. It is located in the west of the krai. The area of the district is 1,499 square kilometers (579 sq mi). Its administrative center is the rural locality (a stanitsa) of Kalininskaya. Population: 50,691 (2010 census); 50,161 (2002 census); 45,111 (1989 Soviet census). The population of Kalininskaya accounts for 26.4% of the district's total population.
