= Kalininsk =

Kalininsk may refer to:

- Kalininsk, Kyrgyzstan, a village in Kyrgyzstan
- Kalininsk Urban Settlement, a municipal formation which the town of Kalininsk in Kalininsky District of Saratov Oblast, Russia is incorporated as
- Kalininsk, Russia, several inhabited localities in Russia
