= SG radar =

American surface-search radar

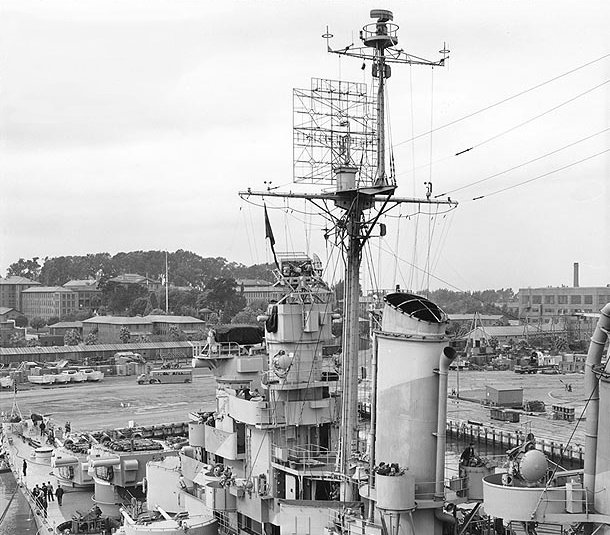
- SG (at the top of the mast) and SK-1 (below and to the left of the SG) radar antennas of USS Astoria
- Country of origin: United States
- Designer: Raytheon; MIT Radiation Laboratory; Naval Research Laboratory
- Introduced: 1942
- No. built: 955
- Type: Surface-search radar
- Frequency: 3 GHz
- PRF: 775, 800, or 825
- Beamwidth: 5.6° (horizontal); 15° (vertical)
- Pulsewidth: 1.3–2 μs
- RPM: 4, 8, or 12
- Range: 15 nmi (28 km; 17 mi)
- Precision: 200 yd (180 m)
- Power: 50 kW

The SG radar was a US Navy surface-search radar for large warships developed during the Second World War. The first operational set was installed aboard the heavy cruiser USS Augusta in April 1942. It was the first Navy radar to use S-band (microwave) frequencies and the first surface-search radar to be equipped with a plan position indicator (PPI), the ancestor of virtually all modern radar displays.

The radar was developed by Raytheon under the guidance of the MIT Radiation Laboratory and Naval Research Laboratory using the cutting-edge multicavity magnetron technology developed in Britain and brought to the US by the Tizard Mission. The prototype was tested at sea aboard the destroyer USS Semmes in May 1941. It saw extensive use during World War 2, particularly in the Pacific Theater, with about 1000 units produced during the war, and remained in service for about 2 decades. Designed for installation on destroyers and larger ships to search for low-flying warplanes and surface ships, it achieved greatly improved surface coverage and detection of aircraft compared with previous lower frequency radars. It also proved a superior navigation aid, making possible the detection of buoys and shoreline at night or bad weather.

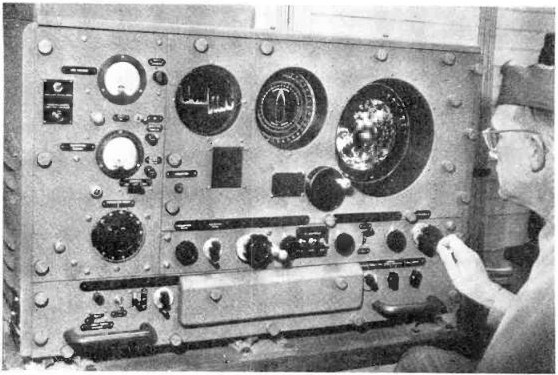
Operating console. The three large round displays are (left to right): "A display" of return signal versus time, gyrocompass readout, and PPI (Plan Position Indicator) display

== Bibliography ==
- Brown, Louis (1999). A Radar History of World War II: Technical and Military Imperatives. Bristol and Philadelphia: Institute of Physics Publishing. ISBN 0-7503-0659-9.
- Friedman, Norman (1981). Naval Radar. London: Conway Maritime Press. ISBN 0-85177-238-2.
- Watson, Raymond C. Jr. (2009). Radar Origins Worldwide: History of Its Evolution in 13 Nations Through World War II. Trafford. ISBN 978-1-4269-2111-7.
