= USS Johnson =

USS Johnson may refer to various United States Navy ships:

- USS Cape Johnson (AP-172), a troop transport in commission from 1944 to 1946
- USS Catherine Johnson (SP-390), later Freight Lighter No. 161, YF-161, and YC-660, a freight lighter in commission from 1918 to 1930
- USS Earl V. Johnson (DE-702), a destroyer escort in commission from 1944 to 1946
- USS George A. Johnson (DE-583), a destroyer escort in commission from 1944 to 1946 and from 1950 to 1957
- USS George H. Johnson (SP-379), the proposed name and designation of a commercial freight lighter the United States Navy considered for service during World War I but never acquired
- USS LST-849, a tank landing ship in commission from 1944 to 1946 which was renamed USS Johnson County (LST-849) in 1955 while in reserve
- USS Lyndon B. Johnson (DDG-1002), the third and final Zumwalt-class destroyer, built by Bath Iron Works
- USS Ralph Johnson (DDG-114), the 64th Arleigh Burke-class destroyer, built by Huntington Ingalls
- SS Manchuria, a passenger and cargo ship serving in World War I as the troop transport USS Manchuria (ID-1633) from April 1918 to September 1919, renamed President Johnson 1928 which from 1941 to 1946 saw service as a War Shipping Administration troop transport sometimes mistakenly termed "USS" or Army transport
- USS Pinkney (APH-2) an evacuation transport in commission from 1942 to 1946 which served as the United States Army transport USAT Pvt. Elden H. Johnson from 1947 to 1950 and in the U.S. Navy's Military Sea Transportation Service as USNS Pvt. Elden H. Johnson from 1950 to 1957

== See also ==
- USS Johnston
