= USS Johnston =

Two ships have been named USS Johnston in the United States Navy in honor of John Vincent Johnston.

- USS Johnston (DD-557), was a Fletcher-class destroyer, which sank in the Battle off Samar in 1944
- USS Johnston (DD-821), was a Gearing-class destroyer launched 10 October 1945 and transferred to Taiwan in 1980

== See also ==
- USS Johnson
