= USS Johnston (DD-557) =

United States Fletcher-class destroyer

Coordinates: 11°46′N 126°09′E

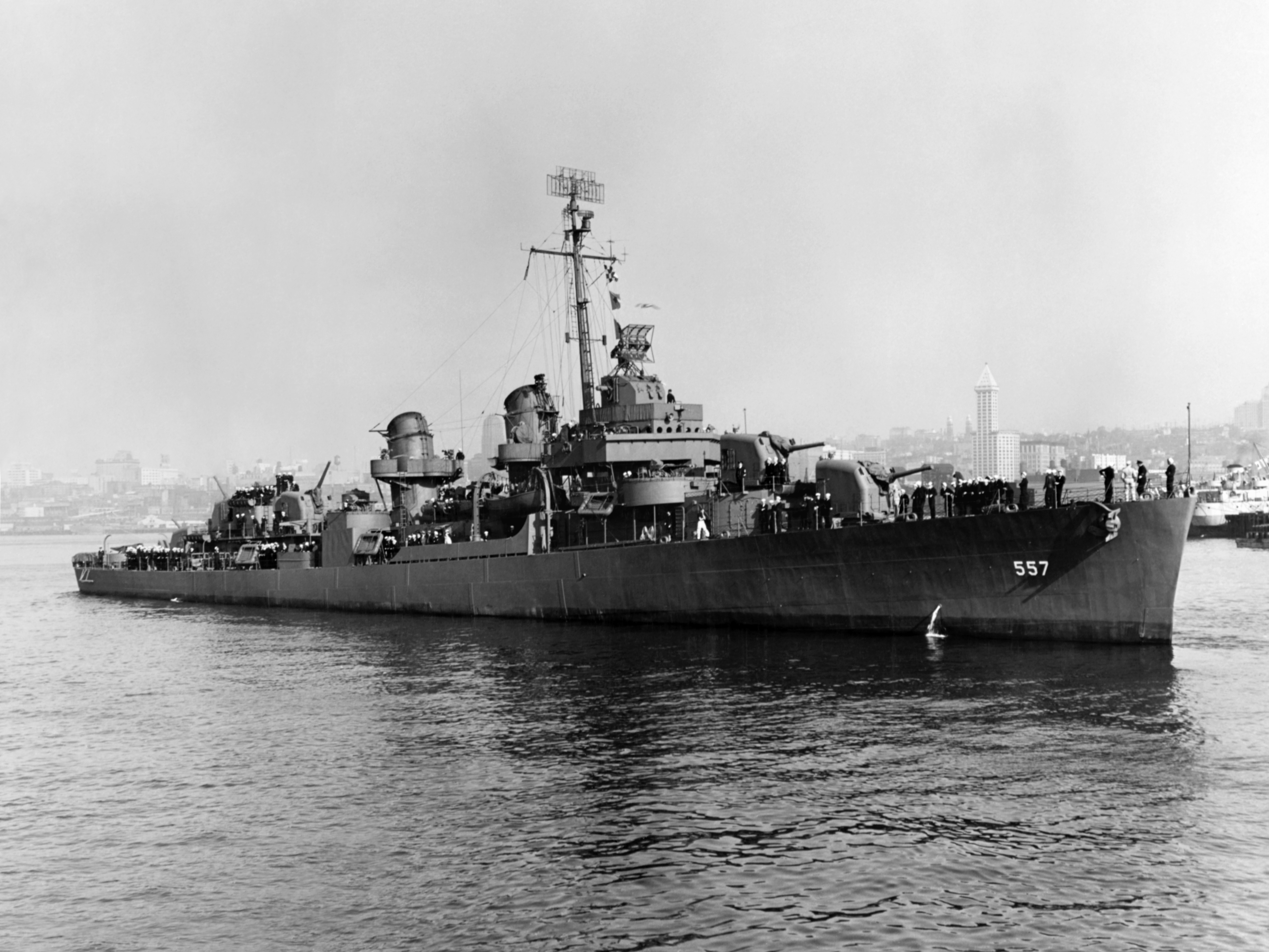
- Johnston in Seattle, 27 October 1943

History

United States
- Name: Johnston
- Namesake: John V. Johnston
- Builder: Seattle-Tacoma Shipbuilding Corporation
- Laid down: 6 May 1942
- Launched: 25 March 1943
- Commissioned: 27 October 1943
- Stricken: 27 November 1944
- Nickname(s): "GQ Johnny"
- Honors and awards: Presidential Unit Citation, 6 Battle Stars
- Fate: Sunk 25 October 1944, Battle off Samar

General characteristics
- Class & type: Fletcher-class destroyer
- Displacement: 2,100 long tons (2,134 t) (standard)
- Length: 376 ft 6 in (114.76 m)
- Beam: 39 ft 8 in (12.1 m)
- Draft: 17 ft 9 in (5.4 m)
- Installed power: 4 × Babcock & Wilcox boilers; 60,000 shp (45,000 kW)
- Propulsion: 2 × shafts; 2 × geared steam turbines
- Speed: 38 knots (70 km/h; 44 mph)
- Range: 6,500 nmi (7,500 mi; 12,000 km) at 15 kn (28 km/h; 17 mph)
- Complement: 273
- Sensors & processing systems: 1 × QC series sonar; 1 × Mk 4 or Mk 12 fire-control radar; 1 × SC-2 early-warning radar; 1 × SG surface-search radar
- Armament: 5 × single Mk 12 5 in (127 mm)/38 guns; 5 × twin 40 mm (1.6 in) Bofors AA guns; 7 × single 20 mm (0.8 in) Oerlikon AA guns; 2 × quintuple 21 in (533 mm) torpedo tubes; 6 × single depth charge throwers; 2 × depth charge racks

USS Johnston (DD-557) was a Fletcher-class destroyer built for the United States Navy during World War II. She was named after Lieutenant John V. Johnston, an officer of the US Navy during the American Civil War. Johnston was laid down in May 1942 and was launched on 25 March 1943. She entered active duty on 27 October 1943 under the command of Lieutenant Commander Ernest E. Evans and was assigned to the US Pacific Fleet. Johnston provided naval gunfire support for American ground forces during the Gilbert and Marshall Islands campaign in January and February 1944 and again, after three months of patrol and escort duty in the Solomon Islands, during the recapture of Guam in July. Thereafter, Johnston was tasked with escorting escort carriers during the Mariana and Palau Islands campaign and the liberation of the Philippines.

On 25 October 1944, while assigned as part of the escort to six escort carriers, Johnston, two other Fletcher-class destroyers, and four destroyer escorts were engaged by a large Imperial Japanese Navy flotilla. In what became known as the Battle off Samar, Johnston and the other escort ships charged the Japanese ships to protect nearby US carriers and transport craft. After engaging several Japanese capital ships and a destroyer squadron, Johnston was sunk with 187 dead, including Evans. Johnston's wreck was discovered on 30 October 2019 but was not properly identified until March 2021. Lying more than 20,000 feet (6,100 m) below the surface of the ocean, it was the deepest shipwreck ever surveyed until the 22 June 2022 discovery of USS Samuel B. Roberts, sunk during the same engagement.

== Design and characteristics ==
To rectify the top-heaviness and stability problems of the preceding Benson and Gleaves classes, the Fletcher class was greatly increased in size over the older designs. This allowed them to accept additional anti-aircraft (AA) guns and electronic equipment as well as their operators without sacrificing guns or torpedoes as the older ships were forced to do during the war. The Fletchers displaced 2,100 long tons (2,134 t) at standard load and 2,544 long tons (2,585 t) at deep load, roughly 30 percent more than the Bensons and Gleaves.

In early 1942, the design of the Fletchers was modified to reduce top weight and to simplify the construction of the bridge by squaring off the curves at its front. One deck was removed from the aft superstructure and the base of the fire-control director above the bridge was shortened by six feet (1.8 m). The splinter plating protecting the bridge and the director was also reduced in thickness. In addition, visibility from the bridge was improved by the addition of an open platform connected to the bridge wings.

The ships had an overall length of 376 feet 6 inches (114.76 m), with a draft of 17 feet 9 inches (5.41 m) and beam of 39 feet 8 inches (12.09 m). The ships were powered by two General Electric geared steam turbines that each drove one propeller shaft using steam provided by four Babcock & Wilcox boilers. The turbines produced 60,000 shaft horsepower (45,000 kW) which was intended to give the ships a top speed of 37.8 knots (70.0 km/h; 43.5 mph). The destroyers carried enough fuel oil to give them a range of 4,490 nautical miles (8,320 km; 5,170 mi) at 15 knots (28 km/h; 17 mph). They were crewed by 9 officers and 264 enlisted men.

=== Armament, fire control, protection and sensors ===
The main battery of the Fletcher-class destroyers consisted of five dual-purpose 5 in (127 mm)/38 caliber guns (Note: /38 refers to the length of the gun in terms of calibers. A /38 gun is 38 times long as its bore diameter.) in single mounts which were grouped in superfiring pairs fore and aft of the superstructure. The fifth mount was positioned on the aft superstructure forward of the aft pair. The guns were controlled by the Mark 37 director. Their anti-aircraft battery depended on the availability of the weapons, but Johnston was built with ten 40 mm (1.6 in) Bofors guns in five powered twin-gun mounts and seven manually operated 20 mm (0.8 in) Oerlikon cannons. The forward pair of Bofors mounts were located forward of the bridge and the second pair were on platforms abreast the aft funnel with one mount on each broadside; the last mount was positioned between the aft superfiring pair of guns and the single mounts forward of them. Each mount was controlled by a nearby Mark 51 director. Four Oerlikons were located amidships, two on each broadside, and three were grouped in a triangle at the stern, next to the depth charge racks.

The ships were fitted with two racks, each holding eight 600-pound (270 kg) depth charges and adjacent to them were two storage racks with five depth charges each. Abreast the aft superstructure were six "K-gun" throwers, three on each side, with five 300-pound (140 kg) depth charges. The destroyers were equipped with two quintuple rotating 21-inch (533 mm) torpedo tube mounts for Mark 15 torpedoes.

The Fletchers had only minimal armor that was intended to protect against shell splinters and fragments. The sides of the propulsion machinery compartments consisted of plates 0.75 inches (19 mm) of special treatment steel (STS) while the deck above them consisted of 0.5-inch (12.7 mm) STS. The "square bridge" ships like Johnston had the splinter armor of the bridge reduced from the 0.75-inch armor of the earlier "round bridge" ships to 0.25 inches (6.4 mm). Furthermore, the protective plating of the Mark 37 director was reduced from the earlier 0.75 inches to 0.5 inches.

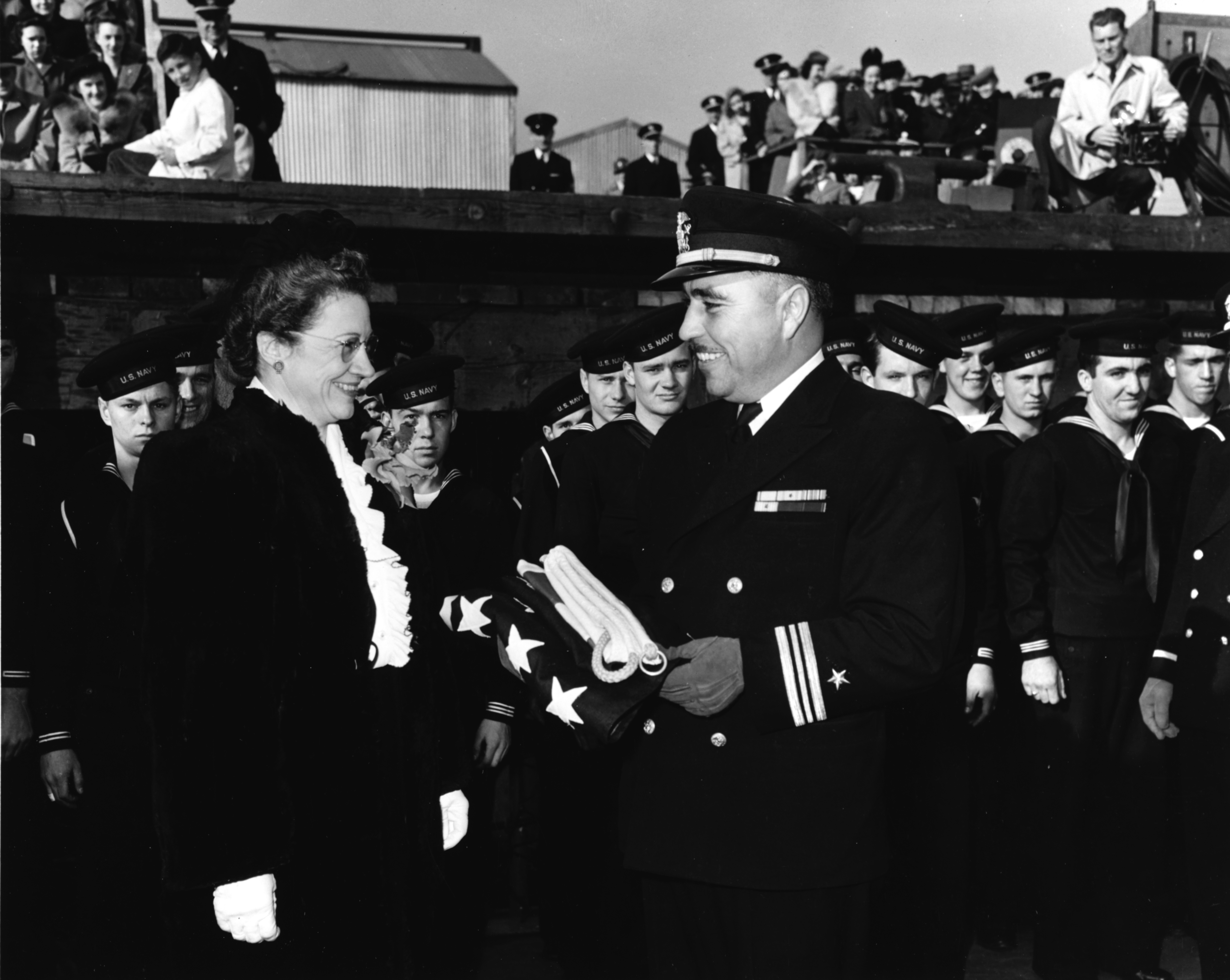
Ernest E. Evans, the Commander of Johnston for the entirety of her service, present at her commissioning, October 27, 1943

The Fletcher-class destroyers were equipped with a Mark 4 or Mark 12 fire-control radar on the roof of the Mark 37 director. A SC-2 early-warning radar and a SG surface-search radar were fitted on the foremast. For anti-submarine work, the ships used a QC series sonar.

== Construction and service history ==
Construction of Johnston, named after Lieutenant John V. Johnston, an officer of the US Navy during the American Civil War, began with the laying of her keel at the Seattle-Tacoma Shipbuilding Corporation's yard on 6 May 1942. Her launch, sponsored by Marie S. Klinger, Lt. Johnston's grandniece, took place on 25 March 1943. Johnston was finally commissioned into the United States Navy and placed under the command of Lieutenant Commander Ernest E. Evans, a man of Native American Cherokee descent who had participated in the Battle of the Java Sea and who later commanded the destroyer USS Alden. She then sailed to the Puget Sound Naval Shipyard and fitted out into early November. On 15 November, Johnston sailed for San Diego, California. From 19 November to 1 January 1944, Johnston put out to sea for her shakedown cruise and her crew trained with fleet units near San Diego.

=== Gilbert and Marshall Islands campaign ===
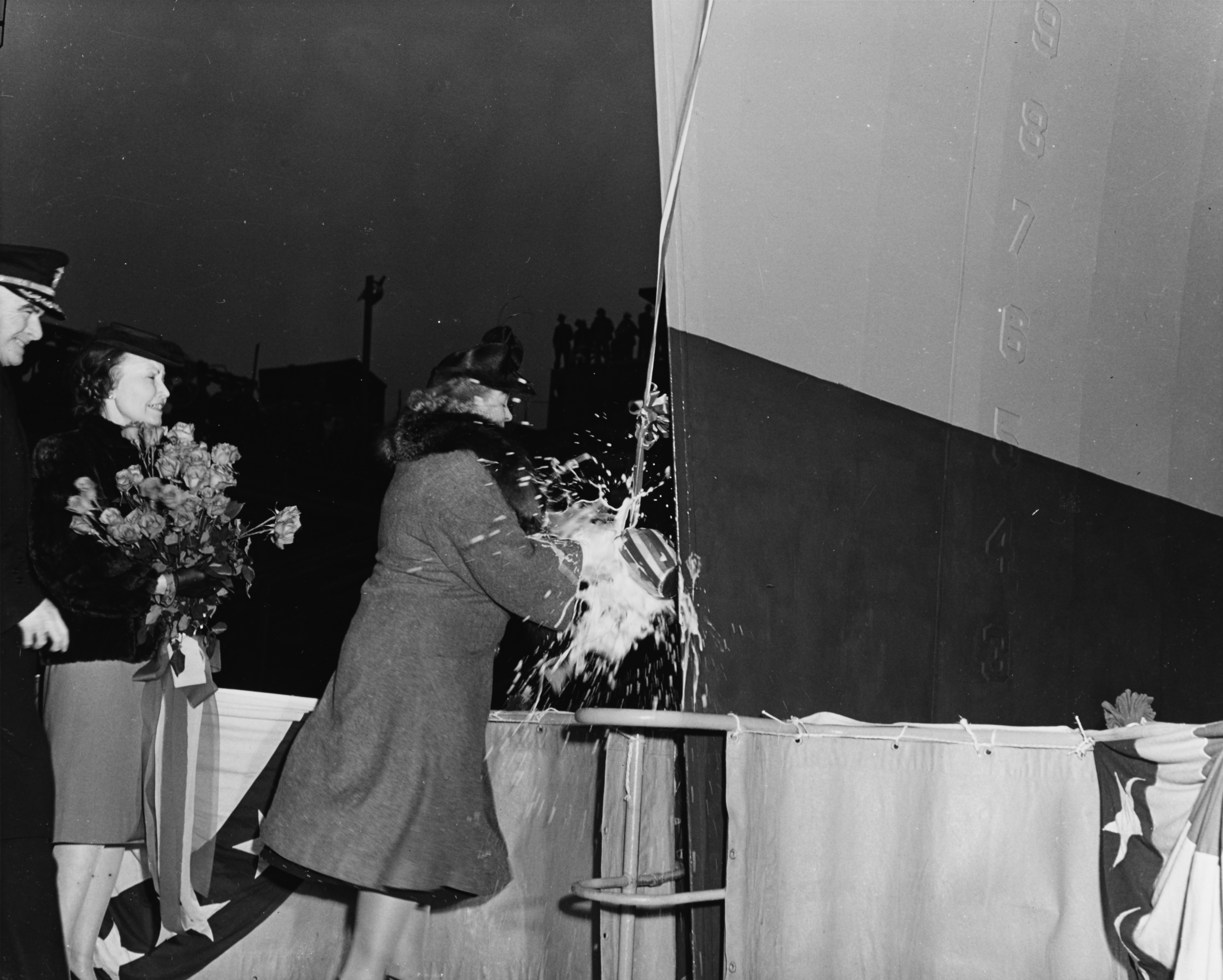
Marie S. Klinger, grandniece of Lt. John V. Johnston, at the ceremonial launch of USS Johnston on 25 March 1943

On 13 January 1944 Johnston set sail for Hawaii with a US Navy squadron led by Rear Admiral Jesse B. Oldendorf and arrived 21 January. From there, Johnston sailed to join the ongoing campaign against the Japanese Empire in the Gilbert and Marshall Islands. She arrived by 29 January and was assigned to Fire Support Group 53.5 under Oldendorf. On 30 January, she screened for the cruisers Santa Fe, Biloxi, Indianapolis, and the battleship Maryland as they provided naval gunfire support for American forces in the Wotje Atoll. Johnston sailed for the Kwajalein Atoll, where from 31 January to 3 February she provided gunfire support for American forces attacking Roi-Namur Island.

Johnston was reassigned on 5 February 1944 to escort transport ships to the Ellice Islands with destroyers Haraden and Stansbury, and the destroyer-minesweeper Long. The convoy set sail on 6 February but en route Johnston was ordered to return to the Marshalls for resupply. She arrived on 8 February, refueled, and then set sail for Kwajalein on 10 February. Her arrival was delayed until the next day after jellyfish clogged and overheated her condensers.

Almost as soon Johnston arrived, she was tasked with investigating a sighting of a Japanese submarine. No such vessel was detected. Early on 12 February, Japanese bombers attacked Roi-Namur, inflicting heavy casualties to the occupying Americans. In response to their detection on radar, Johnston and the other present American ships laid smoke to obscure their positions. They were not attacked. Over the next three days, Johnston resupplied, took on supplies from New Mexico, 5 in shells from Ringgold, and fuel oil from Suamico. Johnston was then attached to Operation Catchpole, the American attack on Enewetak Atoll. From 16 to 18 February, Johnston screened for battleships Pennsylvania, Colorado, and Tennessee, and cruisers Indianapolis, Portland and Louisville as they bombarded Engebi Island. Then, from 19 to 25 February, Johnston provided gunfire support for American troops herself and patrolled for submarines.

=== Solomon Islands campaign ===
On 25 February 1944, Johnston was relieved of patrol duty and was assigned to screen the escort carrier Manila Bay with Hoel. The trio was ordered back to the Marshall Islands on 28 February and arrived on 1 March. Johnston resupplied over the next five days. On 7 March the flotilla, joined by Natoma Bay, sailed for Espiritu Santo and arrived on 13 March. Johnston docked in the auxiliary floating drydock Waterford for minor repairs from 18 to 19 March, then set out for the Solomon Islands on 20 March. She arrived at Purvis Bay, near Guadalcanal, the following day and was subsequently assigned to patrol duties around New Ireland. On 27–28 March, Johnston and her sister ships Franks, Haggard, and Hailey were dispatched to bombard Kapingamarangi Atoll, in the Caroline Islands. Upon their return to the Solomons on 29 March, the destroyers were assigned additional patrol duties. For the rest of March and all of April, they patrolled the northern Solomons, escorted Allied shipping to and from them, and occasionally provided gunfire support for the US Army's XIV Corps on Bougainville Island.

Johnston began May 1944 moored in Purvis Bay undergoing minor repairs. On 6 May, she sailed to New Georgia with Franks, Haggard, Hailey, and Hoel to screen for Montpelier and Cleveland and then for a minelaying operation between Bougainville and Buka Island on 10 May. Two days later, Haggard, Franks and Johnston were alerted by an American scout plane to the presence of the Japanese submarine I-176 off Buka. The destroyers immediately began searching for the vessel and, late on 16 May, discovered it. Haggard, then Johnston, and then Franks attacked the submarine with depth charges and sank it after midnight on 17 May. The destroyers resumed their anti-submarine patrols on 18 May, then screened for Montpelier, Cleveland, and Birmingham as they shelled Japanese coastal guns on the Shortland Islands two days later. Johnston thereafter resumed patrol and escort duty, then docked with the destroyer tender Dixie for minor repairs from 27 May to 2 June.

=== Mariana and Palau Islands campaign ===
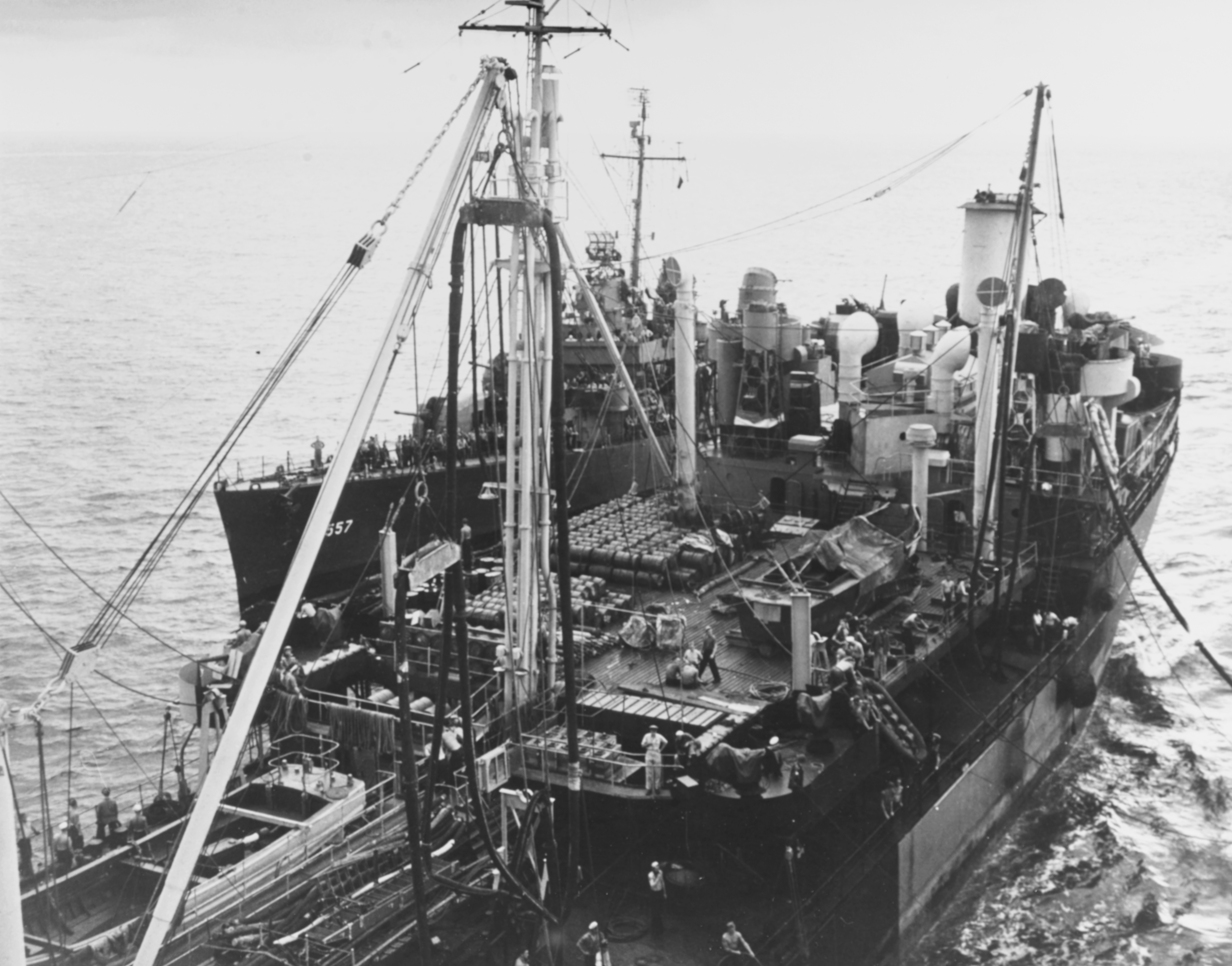
Johnston refueling from the oiler Millicoma, 12 August 1944

On 3 June 1944, Johnston joined a convoy of US warships headed to Kwajalein to join a fleet gathering to recapture Guam. The convoy arrived on 8 June, then made for Guam four days later with the invasion force and arrived by 18 June. The ongoing Battle of Saipan, however, delayed the invasion. On 30 June, the fleet was ordered to return to Kwajalein; Johnston arrived on 3 July and returned to patrol duty. When the invasion force was ordered back to Guam on 14 July, Johnston again sailed as part of its screen. The fleet arrived four days later. From 21 July to 1 August, Johnston joined several battleships, cruisers, and destroyers to furnish gunfire support for the 1st Marine Brigade and the 77th Infantry Division. Afterwards, from 2 to 9 August, she screened for American ships. On 9 August, Johnston was ordered, with Franks, Haggard, Haily, Halford, Guest, Minneapolis, Cleveland, and Honolulu to return to the Marshalls.

The flotilla arrived on 12 August, resupplied, and then sailed for Espiritu Santo from 19 to 24 August. Three days later, after undergoing minor repairs, Johnston set sail for Purvis Bay with Pennsylvania, Idaho, Louisville, Minneapolis, and seven other destroyers. The flotilla arrived on 29 August and joined escort carriers Marcus Island, Ommaney Bay, Petrof Bay, Kalinin Bay, with whom Johnston trained for carrier escort duty. On 4 September, Johnston, Haggard, Hailey, and Welles, escorting Petrof Bay, Kalinan Bay, and Saginaw Bay, set sail for the Palau Islands and the invasions of Peleliu and of Angaur. Johnston escorted these escort carriers until 18 September, when Johnston was reassigned to escort Kitkun Bay, White Plains, and Gambier Bay. Johnston and her charges received orders on 21 September to proceed to Ulithi, an atoll in the Caroline Islands, where they arrived on 23 September.

=== Battle off Samar ===
The flotilla departed Ulithi on 25 September 1944 and arrived in Seeadler Harbor, in the Admiralty Islands on 1 October 1944. There, on 12 October, Johnston was assigned to the US 7th Fleet, which was preparing to invade the Philippines. Johnston was attached, with Hoel, Heermann, and the destroyer escorts Dennis, John C. Butler, Samuel B. Roberts, and Raymond, to the escort carriers Fanshaw Bay, St. Lo, White Plains, Gambier Bay, Kalinin Bay, and Kitkun Bay. These ships formed TU 77.4.3 (call sign "Taffy 3"), a sub-unit of the 7th Fleet's Escort Carrier Group (TG 77.4) commanded by Rear Admiral Clifton Sprague, aboard Fanshaw Bay, and sailed into Leyte Gulf on 17 October.

In response to the Invasion of the Philippines, on 18 October, the Imperial Japanese Navy dispatched three fleets to cut off and destroy the American ground forces. The largest fleet was placed under the command of Vice Admiral Takeo Kurita and took a path that, on 25 October, led it to TG 77.4.

Though Kurita's fleet – by 25 October numbering four battleships, eight cruisers, and 11 destroyers – had been attacked by US submarines and aircraft over the previous two days, TG 77.4 was not made aware of the Japanese force until Taffy 3's surface radar detected it at 0646. Johnston, 34,000 yards (31,000 m) south-east from the Japanese, was informed of its presence at 0650; eight minutes later, the Japanese opened fire, beginning the Battle off Samar. The force was led by Kurita's flagship, the battleship Yamato, the largest and most powerfully armed and armored battleship ever built, displacing 72,808 tons and armed with nine 18.1-inch (46 cm) guns. Escorting Yamato came the older but still capable battleships Nagato, Kongō, and Haruna, six heavy cruisers, two light cruisers, and eleven destroyers.

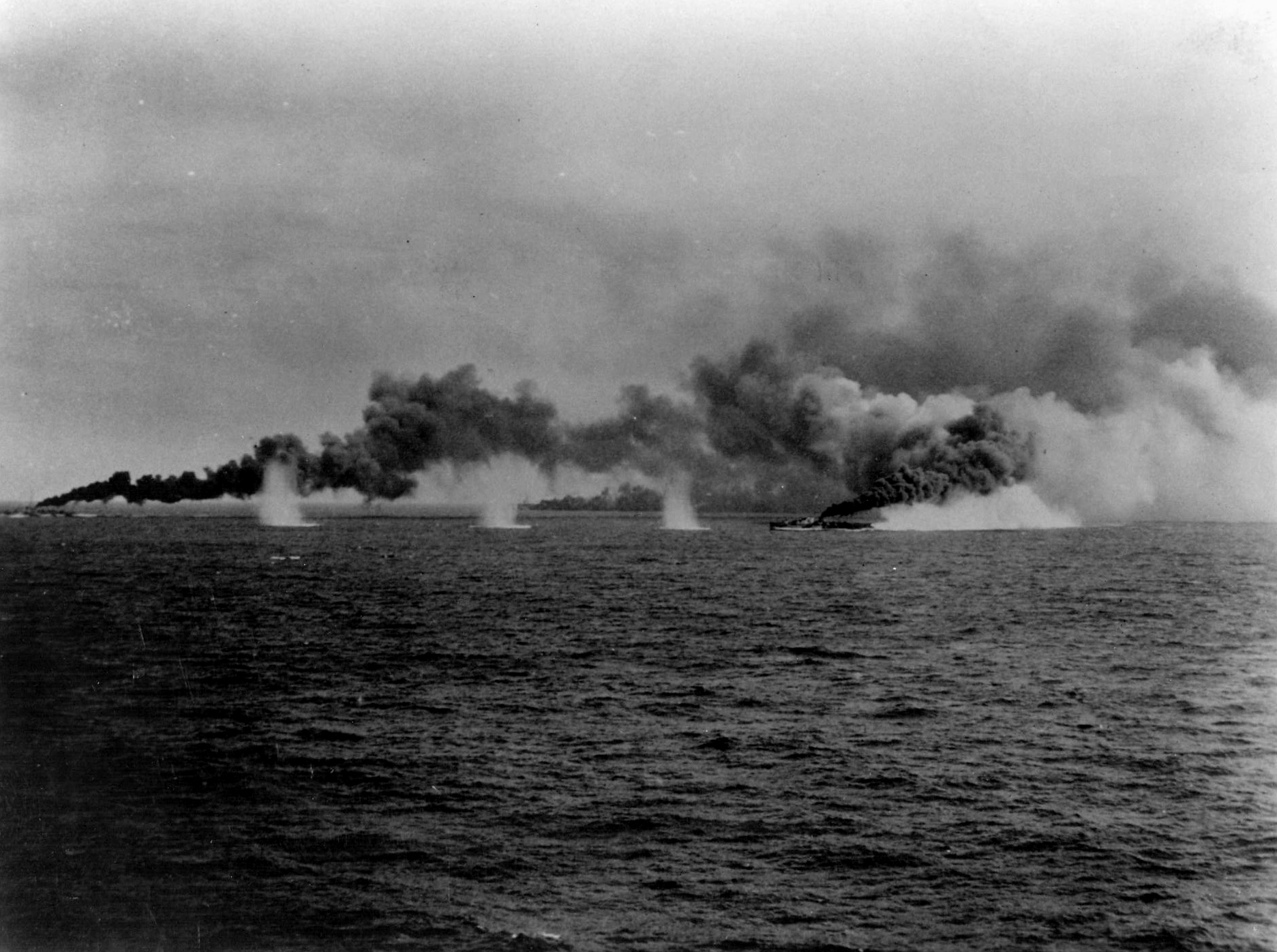
Johnston and USS Hoel laying a smokescreen during the battle off Samar, 25 October 1944

==== Johnston's torpedo charge ====
At 0657, Sprague ordered Taffy 3 to head east at top speed and lay smoke. Despite the overwhelming odds against the force, finding Johnston at the rear of the formation, Commander Ernest E. Evans ordered a turn to the northeast so that Johnston could charge the Japanese for a torpedo attack and lay smoke to cover the flotilla's escape.

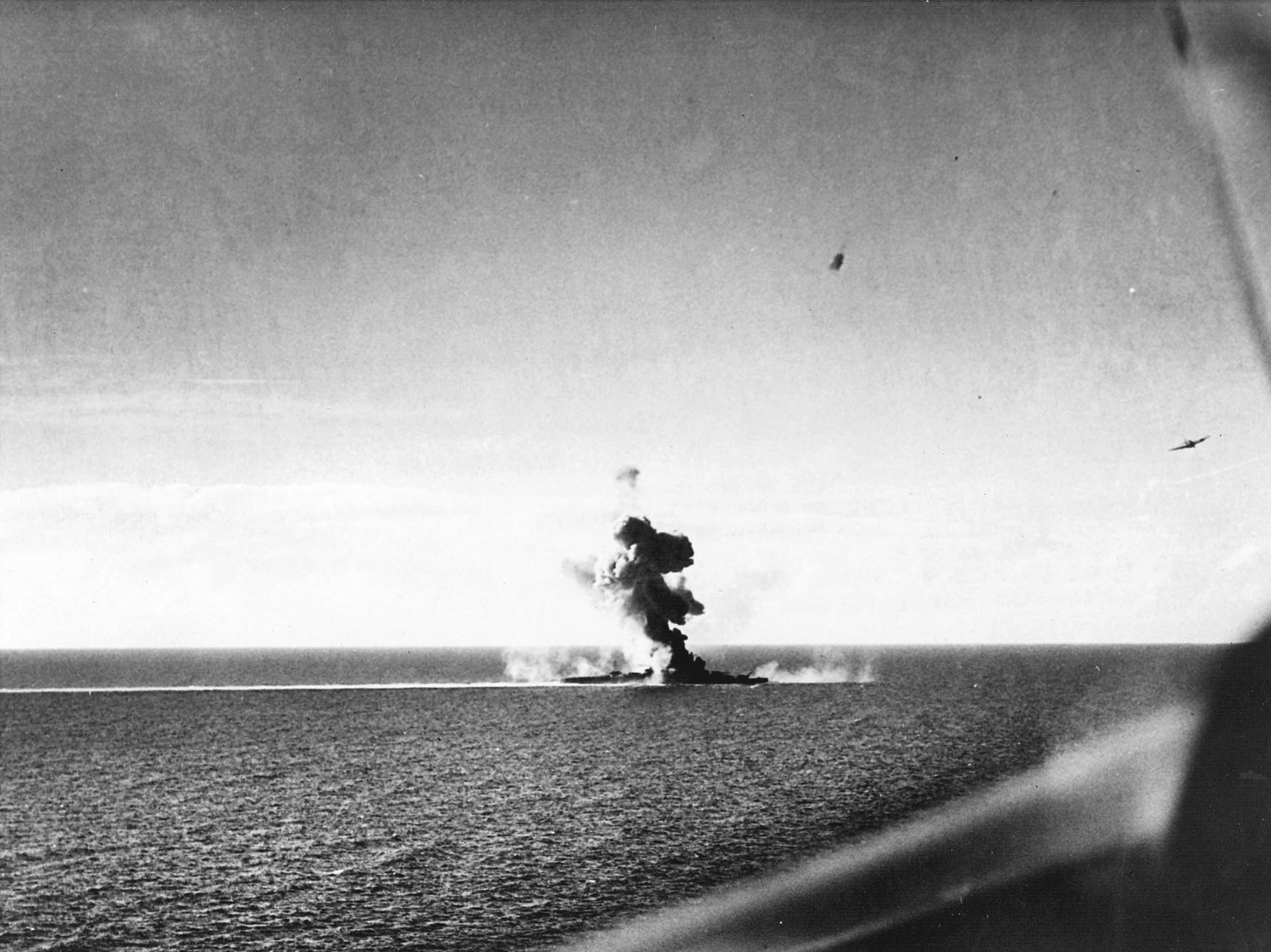
Kumano under air attacks on 26 October 1944, seen missing her bow courtesy of Johnston

Johnston’s daring charge led several Japanese warships to switch their fire from the carriers to an approaching American “cruiser”. Nagato and Haruna unleashed their main guns on Johnston, while Yamato fired 19 6.1-inch (155 mm) shells from her secondary battery; all of this fire missed Johnston, sometimes narrowly. At 7:15, Johnston noticed a flotilla of four Japanese heavy cruisers and singled out the leading heavy cruiser Kumano as she sailed into the 18,000-yard (16,000 m) range of Johnston's 5-inch (127 mm) main battery. Johnston fired more than 200 5-inch (127 mm) shells at Kumano over the next five minutes, striking the cruiser a claimed 45 times and setting her superstructure on fire, while in contrast Kumano and her sister ship Suzuya fired off numerous salvos, but again, not a single Japanese shell hit the American destroyer. Then, having closed to 10,300 yards (9,400 m), Johnston fired all 10 of her torpedoes at Kumano and then turned to hide in her own smoke right as a 14-inch (356 mm) shell from Kongō landed mere inches from Johnston (but did not hit her), spraying red dye on the hull.

At 7:27, Kumano noticed three of Johnston's torpedoes swimming her way at 27 knots and attempted to turn to avoid, but it was too late. One mark 15 torpedo smashed into the cruiser and blew off her entire bow. Her speed was reduced to 12 knots in reverse as Suzuya stopped to remove Captain Teraoka from the crippled Kumano. Dive bombers then attacked the stationary Suzuya and bent one of her propeller shafts, knocking her out of the majority of the battle. More decisively, Kumano was never repaired from the damage inflicted by Johnston, only fitted with a false bow and limited to 15 knots for the rest of her career, and finished off by mixed submarine and air attacks over the next month. Dashing back to the escort carriers, Commander Evans forced two heavy cruisers out of the fight without being hit by a single Japanese projectile.

==== Damage from Yamato ====
However, Yamato had been tracking the enemy "cruiser" which had torpedoed Kumano. Permission to unload the main battery was granted at 7:30 as the nine 18.1-inch (46 cm) guns aimed at the enemy and opened fire at 20,300 yards (18,600 m). Three first salvo 18.1-inch (46 cm) shells tore into Johnston aft below the waterline, cutting her speed to 17 knots and cut power to all of her 5-inch (127 mm) guns. Immediately afterwards, three first salvo 6.1-inch (155 mm) shells from Yamato's secondary battery tore into the destroyer, one hitting amidships and destroying an AA director, while two hit the torpedo director and bridge, destroying her gyrocompass, causing numerous casualties, and severing the fingers of Commander Evans's left hand and blowing off his entire shirt. The ship was mangled badly, with dead and dying sailors strewn across her bloody decks. However, Johnston was crippled but not sunk as she hid behind a rain squall and conducted damage control for 10 minutes as Yamato fired armor piercing shells from her main guns that over-penetrated Johnston without exploding, restoring power to 5-inch (127 mm) turrets 1 and 2. Already depleted before the battle, her remaining store of oil did not fuel a catastrophic explosion. (Note: A myth persisted that this damage was inflicted by 14-inch (356 mm) shells from Kongō at 14,250 yards, who was blinded by a rain squall and at the far end of the battle, not firing a single shot between 7:18 and 8:23. Noshiro and her squadron of 6 destroyers recorded Yamato sinking an enemy ship matching Johnston's position. The rough estimation of the fall of the shell hits was 21,000 yards and 18 degrees; Yamato was at 20,300 yards at 17.5 degrees.)

==== Defense of the escort carriers ====
After turning south to rejoin Taffy 3, Johnston encountered Hoel, Heermann, and Samuel B. Roberts, en route to make their own torpedo attacks. Despite such immense damage, Evans turned Johnston around to follow and support them, in the process exchanging gunfire with the heavy cruiser Haguro. By 0820, the escorts had launched their torpedoes and turned south, making smoke and still exchanging fire with the Japanese, to rejoin Taffy 3. This was accomplished by 0840, when Heermann and Johnston, enveloped in smoke, nearly collided. At that time, Johnston spotted Kongō, 7,000 yards (6,400 m) distant, fired 30 shells at her, and then evaded returned fire from Kongō. Johnston next sighted Gambier Bay, immobile, listing to port, and under fire from numerous warships, and briefly fired on the heavy cruiser Chikuma as the remaining destroyers attempted to cover her, achieving partial success at their own risk as Hoel was sunk by gunfire from Nagato, Haguro and Yamato's secondary battery, while Chikuma engaged in an intense point blank range duel with Heermann and Samuel B. Roberts (Yamato still targeted Gambier Bay with her main guns, which would later sink at 0911). Johnston ceased fire as the light cruiser Yahagi leading the destroyers Yukikaze, Isokaze, Urakaze, and Nowaki approached the other carriers.

Johnston engaged the entire squadron, opening fire on Yahagi at 0850 from 10,000 yards and closed to 7,000 yards (6,400 m). Johnston attempted to cross the squadron's T, limiting them to their forward guns, but the Japanese squadron reacted, turning and engaging the American destroyer with their broadsides. Johnston hit Yahagi 12 times and was in turn struck by several 5-inch (127 mm) shells. Yahagi scored critical damage as at least two 6-inch (152 mm) shells hit the bow and disabled one of Johnston's remaining 5-inch (127 mm) guns, leaving her completely defenseless and starting a large fire that forced the evacuation of the bridge. Yahagi was then strafed by US aircraft, turned to starboard and disengaged. Johnston turned her fire on the Japanese destroyers, which soon also banked starboard and, with Yahagi, discharged their torpedoes at the carriers without effect. The destroyers then focused on Johnston, and, in short order, denuded her of her main mast, last engine and gun, rendered the bridge uninhabitable, and set much of the ship ablaze. Evans moved his command to the fantail, where, at 0945, he ordered the crew to abandon ship, as under sustained and intense gunfire damage, Johnston began to split apart around two thirds down the ship where she was hit by an 18.1-inch (46 cm) shell from Yamato earlier in the battle. At 1010, Johnston rolled over and sank. As she sank, the crew of the Yukikaze sailed past Johnston and saluted her crew. Of her complement of 327 men, 186 men and officers died. Commander Ernest E Evans was observed abandoning ship in a lifeboat but was never seen again and presumed dead. The remaining 141 men were rescued by American vessels after 50 hours at sea. Johnston was struck from the Navy Register on 27 November 1944.

== Awards ==
Johnston received six battle stars and, for the action at Samar, a Presidential Unit Citation. For the same action, Commander Evans was posthumously awarded the Medal of Honor.

== Wreck discovery ==
On 30 October 2019, the research vessel (RV) Petrel, belonging to Vulcan Inc., discovered the remains of what was believed to be Johnston in the Philippine Trench. The remains consisted of a deck gun, a propeller shaft, and some miscellaneous debris that could not be used to identify the wreck, but additional debris was observed lying deeper than the RV could reach. On 31 March 2021, the research vessel DSV Limiting Factor of Caladan Oceanic, financed and piloted by Victor Vescovo, surveyed and photographed the deeper wreck and definitively identified it as Johnston at a depth of 21,180 ft (6,460 m). Until Samuel B. Roberts (22,621 ft; 6,895 m) was discovered on 22 June 2022, Johnston was the deepest discovered shipwreck in the world.

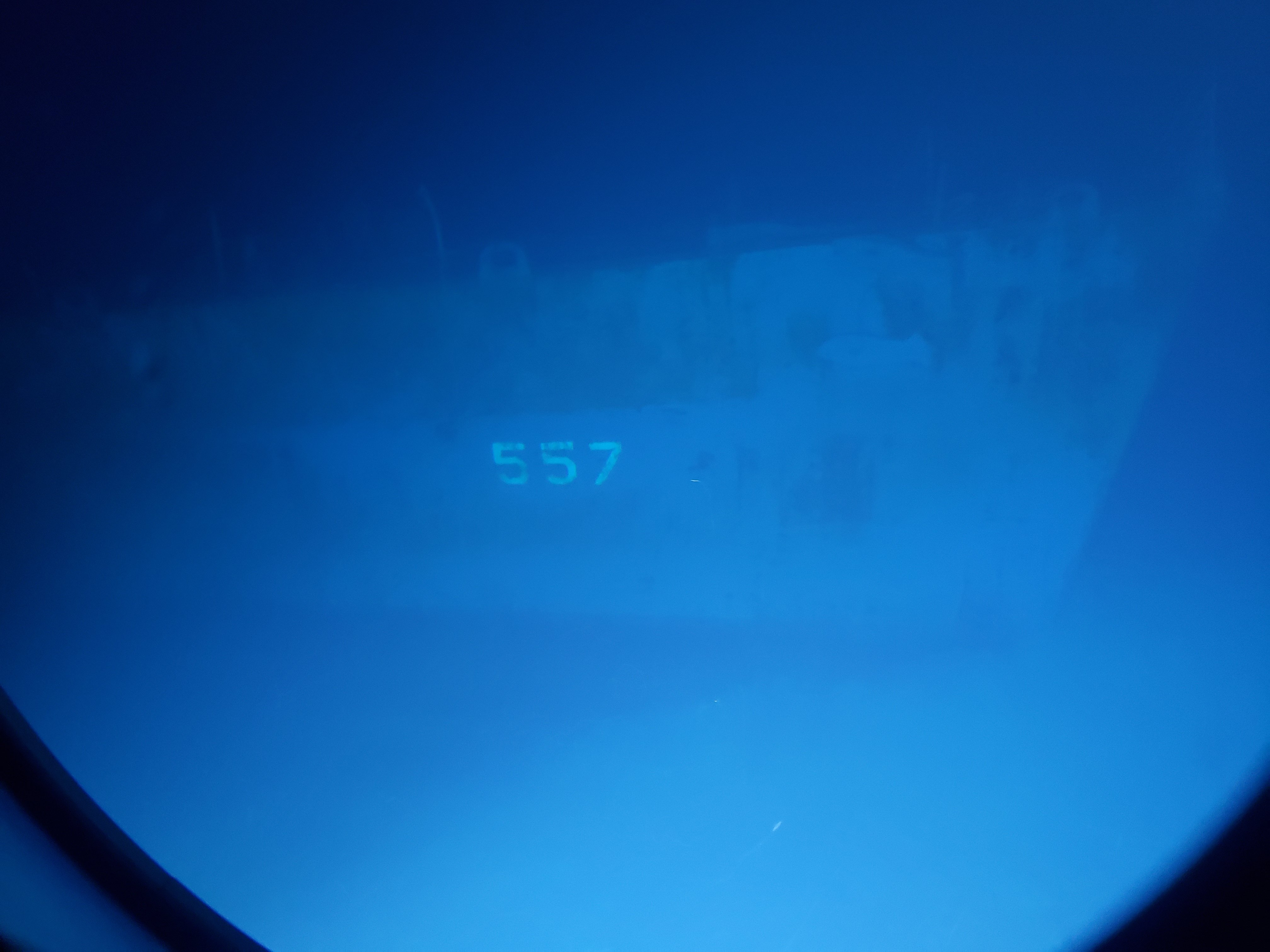
Starboard bow of the wreck of USS Johnston

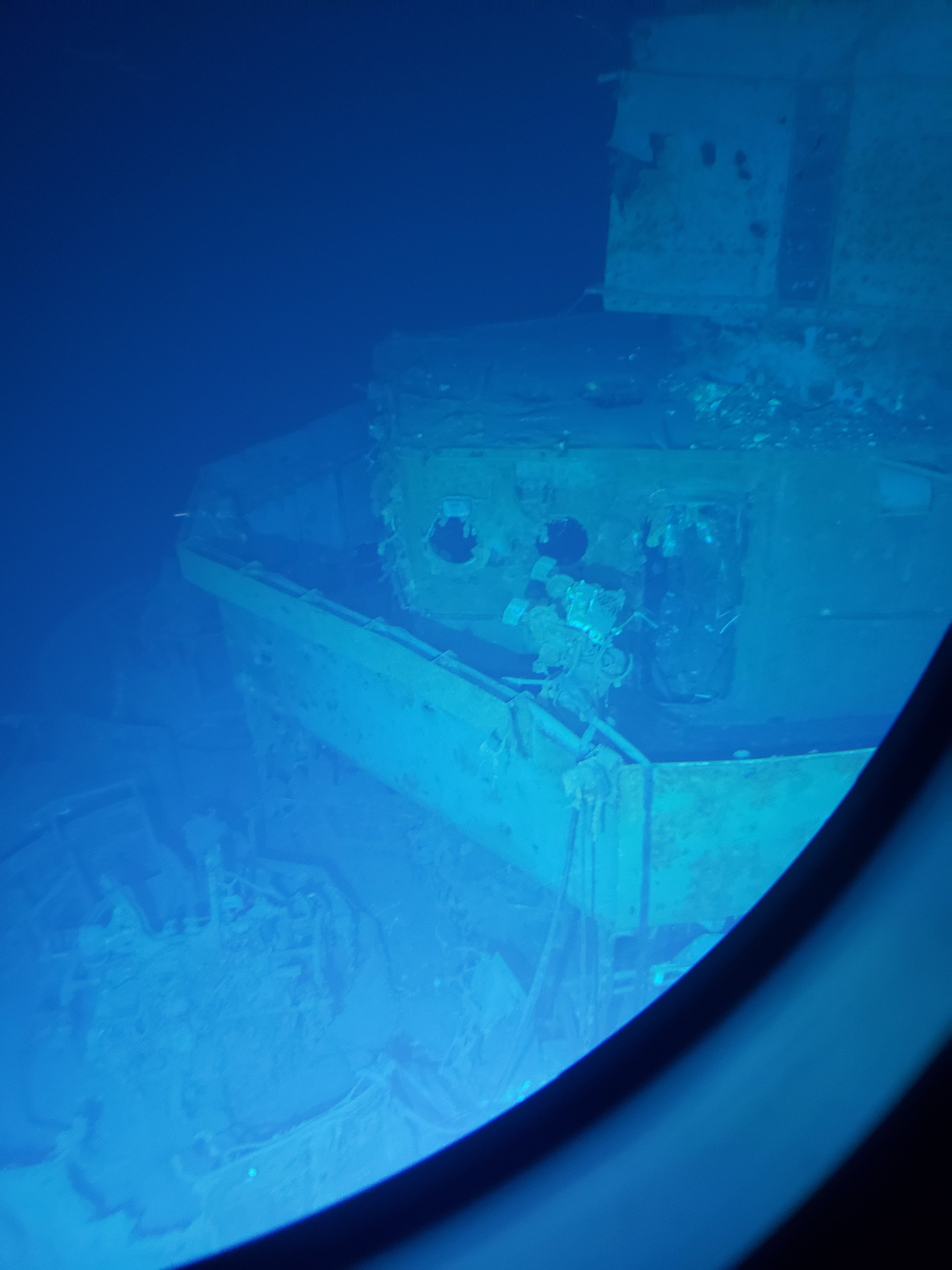
Bridge and Mk 37 Gun Fire Control System (top) of wreck

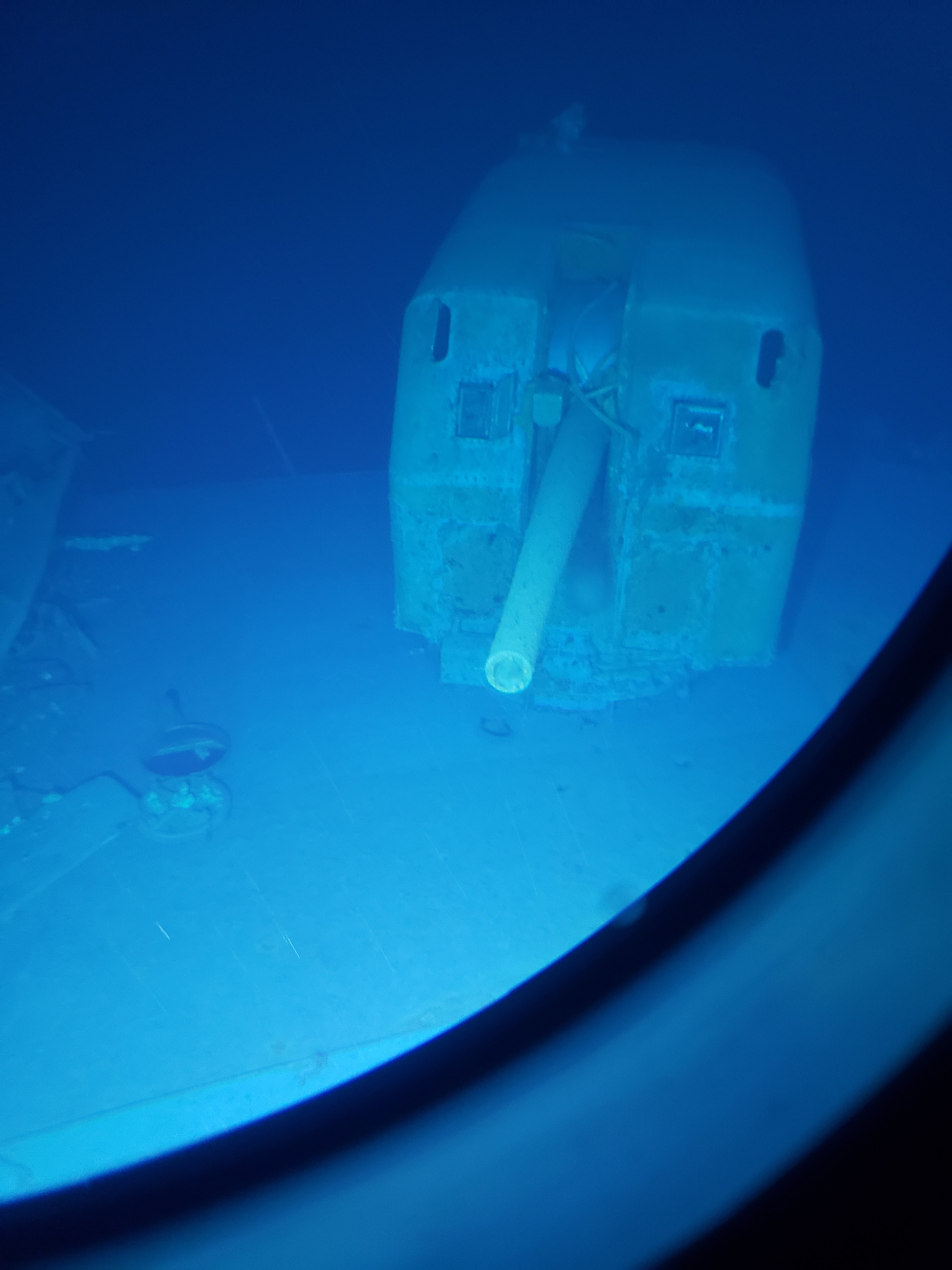
Gun turret No. 51 on the bow of the wreck

Naval historian Parks Stevenson created a 3-D model of Johnston's wreck which shows just how much damage the ship took, and the state the wreck is in. The forward two thirds of the hull still sit upright with her forward 5-inch (127 mm) guns and rangefinder turned to starboard at the enemy ships she faced before she went down. Her hull number, 557, is still a bright white and clearly visible, and her hull is buried in the sand up to the waterline. Enemy damage plagued Johnston as shell holes from numerous destroyers and Yahagi riddled the ship, punching into the sides and wrecking her superstructure, and Johnston split in two where she was hit by an 18.1-inch (46 cm) shell from Yamato, leaving Johnston's back third undiscovered, if it is even recognizable. Despite that, the bridge is still fully intact and recognizable, with damage from a 6.1-inch (155 mm) shell from Yamato's secondary battery putting a hole beneath where Evans commanded the ship. Her AA guns are still trained, and several holes in Johnston line up with accounts of enemy damage (such as a 5-inch (127 mm) destroyer shell plunging into the superstructure and disabling her radio control).
