= USS Johnston (DD-821) =

Gearing-class destroyer

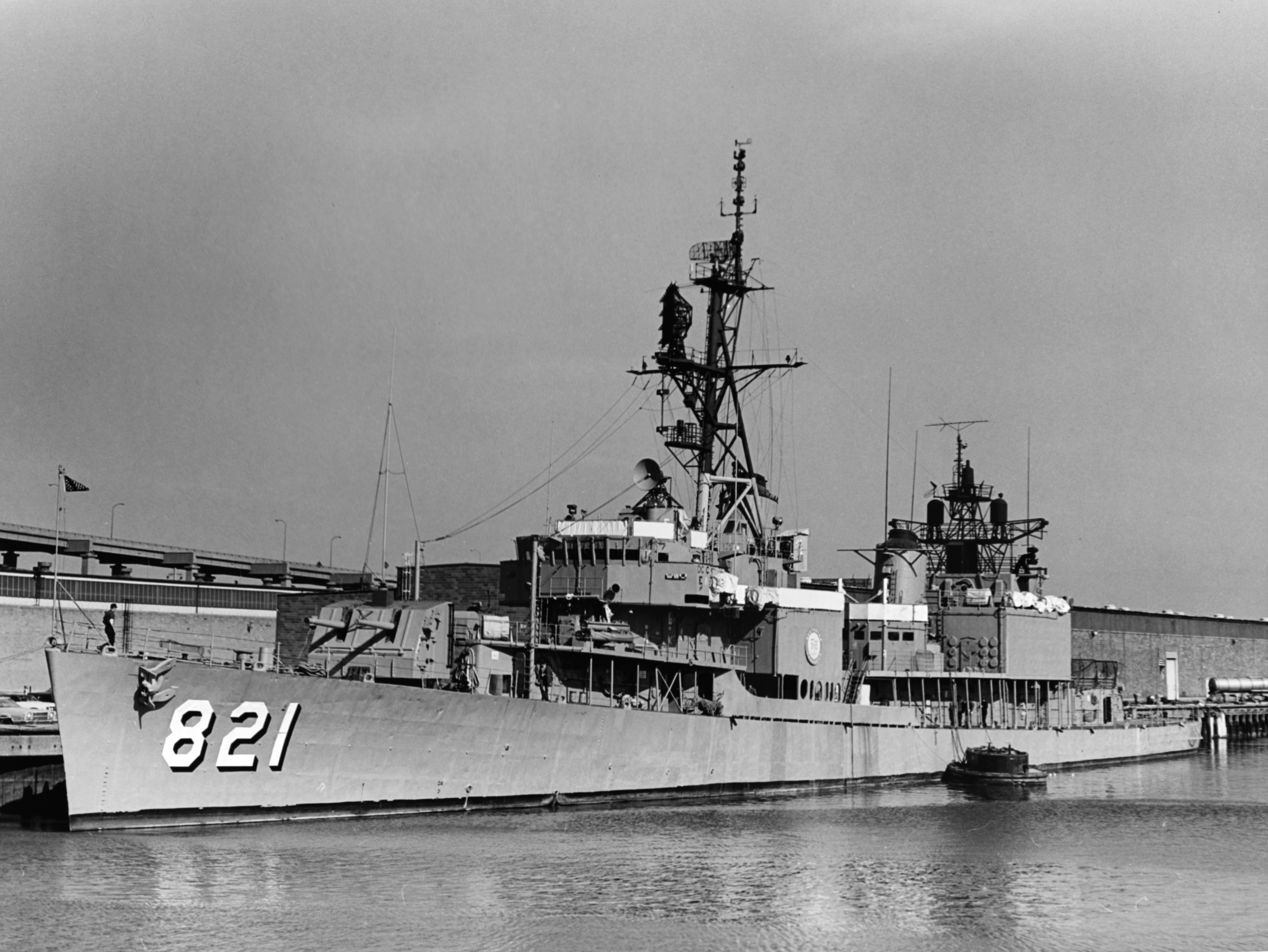
- USS Johnston on 4 January 1980

History

United States
- Name: Johnston
- Namesake: John V. Johnston
- Builder: Consolidated Steel Corporation
- Laid down: 26 March 1945
- Launched: 10 October 1945
- Commissioned: 23 August 1946
- Decommissioned: 27 February 1981
- Stricken: 27 February 1981
- Identification: Callsign: NAYK; Hull number: DD-821
- Motto: We'll Put It to a Venture
- Fate: Transferred to Republic of China, 27 February 1981
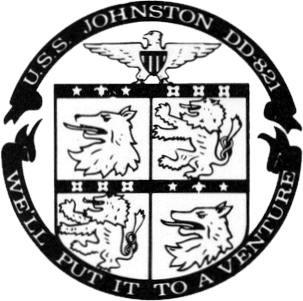
- Badge

History

Taiwan
- Name: Chen Yang; (正陽)
- Namesake: Chen Yang
- Acquired: 27 February 1981
- Commissioned: 17 July 1981
- Decommissioned: 16 December 2003
- Reclassified: DDG-928
- Identification: Hull number: DD-928
- Fate: Sunk as target, 20 July 2006

General characteristics
- Class & type: Gearing-class destroyer
- Displacement: 3,460 long tons (3,516 t) full
- Length: 390 ft 6 in (119.02 m)
- Beam: 40 ft 10 in (12.45 m)
- Draft: 14 ft 4 in (4.37 m)
- Installed power: 60,000 shp (45 MW)
- Propulsion: Geared turbines, 2 shafts
- Speed: 35 knots (65 km/h; 40 mph)
- Range: 4,500 nmi (8,300 km) at 20 kn (37 km/h; 23 mph)
- Complement: 336
- Armament: 6 × 5"/38 caliber guns; 12 × 40 mm AA guns; 11 × 20 mm AA guns; 10 × 21 inch (533 mm) torpedo tubes; 6 × depth charge projectors; 2 × depth charge tracks

USS Johnston (DD-821) was a Gearing-class destroyer of the United States Navy, the second Navy ship named for Lieutenant John V. Johnston, who served in the Navy during the American Civil War.

== Construction and career ==
Johnston was laid down on 26 March 1945, by Consolidated Steel Corporation, Orange, Texas; launched on 10 October 1945; sponsored by Mrs. Marie S. Klinger; grandniece of Lt. J. V. Johnston; and commissioned on 23 August 1946.

=== Service in the United States Navy ===
After shakedown in the Caribbean, Johnston reported to Newport, Rhode Island, on 16 May 1947, for duty with the Atlantic Fleet. Operating out of Newport, its home port, it sailed on 9 February 1948, for Northern Europe where it visited ports in Great Britain, France, and Scandinavia before returning to Newport on 26 June. For fourteen months it operated along the Atlantic coast, then sailed on 23 August 1949, for the Mediterranean. From then until 4 October 1961, it deployed with the 6th Fleet on eight occasions and supported peace-keeping efforts in the Middle East.

While on its first Mediterranean deployment, it helped to stabilize the Adriatic Sea during the Trieste crisis, and it patrolled the coast of Greece to bolster the country's freedom and national security against threatened Communist domination. Johnston returned to Newport on 26 January 1950. It operated out of Newport from Canada to the Caribbean until 4 June 1951, when it departed with Midshipman at sea training off Northern Europe. Following its return to Newport on 28 July, it cleared the East Coast for the Mediterranean on 3 September and joined the 6th Fleet in operations that carried it from French Morocco to Turkey; it then returned to home port on 4 February 1952.

Johnston departed Newport on 7 January 1953, for NATO operations in the North Atlantic. Before sailing for duty in the Mediterranean on 16 March Johnston aided the Dutch after storms in the North Sea had caused extensive flooding in the Netherlands; its crew donated bundles of warm clothing and more than $1,200 for the storm victims. It operated in the Mediterranean until 8 May when it steamed for Newport, arriving on 18 May.

After a four-month deployment in the Mediterranean during early 1954, Johnston operated for more than seventeen months along the Atlantic coast from New England to Cuba. On 5 November 1955, it steamed for maneuvers off Northern Europe, followed by another tour of duty in the Mediterranean. While operating in the eastern Mediterranean during February 1956, it patrolled off Israel and Egypt as the Middle East rumbled over the developing Suez Canal crisis. Returning to Newport on 5 March, it embarked midshipmen on 5 June for two months of at-sea training off Northern Europe, after which it resumed operations out of Newport.

Johnston sailed once again on 6 May 1957, for peace-keeping operations with the 6th Fleet. Before returning to the United States on 1 August it ranged the Mediterranean from Spain to Sicily on anti-submarine warfare (ASW) barrier patrols. While at Marseille, France, on 3 July, it helped fight a destructive blaze on board Lake Champlain (CVS-39). Steaming from Newport on 3 September, it joined the Atlantic Fleet for the NATO Exercise "Strike Back" in the North Atlantic. It returned to Newport on 22 October, then resumed operations that sent it into the Caribbean and the Gulf of Mexico.

Returning to the North Atlantic on 6 June 1959, for further NATO maneuvers, Johnston steamed to Charleston, South Carolina, on 25 July and joined Destroyer Squadron 4 (DesRon 4) for deployment to the Mediterranean. Departing Charleston on 21 September, it conducted Fleet operations in the western Mediterranean; on 18 December it joined naval units from France, Italy, and Spain along the French coast for a review in honor of President Dwight D. Eisenhower. Following patrols along the Greek coast, it departed Athens for the United States on 24 March 1960, arriving at Charleston on 10 April.

Before deploying again to the Mediterranean, Johnston joined in NATO Exercise "Sword Thrust" during the fall of 1960; then it departed Charleston on 8 March 1961, to bolster the 6th Fleet's continuing efforts to maintain peace in the Middle East. After returning to the United States 4 October, it steamed on 19 November for patrol duty off the Dominican Republic. During this brief but important duty its presence did much to stabilize a situation "which had threatened to plunge the country into bitter fighting and a return of the Trujillo dictatorship."

Johnston returned to Charleston on 26 November; and following coastal operations, she steamed to Boston, Massachusetts, where she underwent Fleet Rehabilitation and Modernization (FRAM I) overhaul from 4 January to 31 October 1962. During this time she received the latest equipment, including ASROC system and QH-50 DASH facilities, to prepare her for new assignment in the modern Navy. Departing Boston on 2 November, she arrived Guantanamo Bay, Cuba, via Charleston on 10 December for Caribbean operations. While steaming near Mona Island on 1 February 1963, it rescued sinking Honduran freighter Kirco and towed her to Mayaguez, Puerto Rico. Continuing her Atlantic operations, she supported Polaris missile firing tests. As Thomas Jefferson (SSBN-618) fired two underwater missiles off the Florida coast on 14 March, Johnston became the first destroyer to serve as "primary support ship for an underwater firing of a Polaris missile."

After more than four months of ASW tactical operations, Johnston departed Charleston on 6 August for her ninth deployment to the Mediterranean. While operating with the 6th Fleet, she steamed the length and breadth of the Mediterranean and entered the Black Sea on 27 September. During the cruise to Turkish Black Sea ports she served as a symbol of America's determination to safeguard peace on land through strength on the sea. Following two months of ASW operations, Johnston departed Cannes, France, for the United States on 7 December and arrived Charleston on 23 December for coastal operations through 1964.

The veteran destroyer departed Charleston on 6 January 1965 for the Mediterranean to resume peace-keeping operations with forces of other NATO countries. She returned to Charleston on 7 June, and devoted the rest of the year to operations with Polaris submarines, amphibious exercises, and overhaul to prepare for future service.

Johnston began New Year 1966 as sonar school training ship at Key West, Florida During this period of training she visited Guantanamo Bay, Cuba, for refresher training; and in February while Johnston's crew was spending weekend liberty at Kingston, Jamaica, her sailors swiftly answered a call for help on the 27th. The famous Myrtle Bank Hotel had caught fire and threatened the whole waterfront. Johnston sailors rushed to the fire and averted disaster.

Johnston operated off the East Coast until departing Charleston on 29 September for Mediterranean and Middle East deployment. After operating on the far side of the Suez Canal, she again transited the Suez Canal to rejoin the 6th Fleet in the Mediterranean. There her exercises with this powerful deterrent force helped to stabilize the area while bringing her to peak readiness for any emergency which might threaten the peace. She returned to Charleston on 9 February 1967 and operated on the East Coast through mid-year.

5 years later, she finally arrived into Philadelphia, Pennsylvania, after her engine room was dismantled and then being towed from Charleston, SC., for decommissioning. After refurbishing she served for the U.S. Naval Reserve Unit there, before being sold to ROCN (Taiwan).

On 27 February 1981, Johnston was stricken from the Naval Vessel Register and transferred to the Republic of China.

=== Service in the Republic of China Navy ===
She was commissioned with the Republic of China Navy as the ROCS Chen Yang (DD-928).

Chen Yang was subject to a major modification and complete rearmament to a guided missile destroyer with the pennant number DDG-928 under the Wu-Chin III program, with the upgrade completed by 1998. All 5 inch guns were removed, with 10 box launchers for SM-1 Standard surface to air missiles fitted, four ahead of the bridge and six right aft on the ship's fantail. A single Otobreda 76 mm gun was mounted forward, with two Bofors 40 mm/L70 guns amidships and a Phalanx 20 mm Close-in weapon system aft. The ships ASROC launcher was retained, although the reload capability was removed. The ship's sensors were also refurbished, with the radar suite changed to a HSA DA-08 air search radar and an AN/SPS-58 air/sea search radar, with HSA STIR-18 and Westinghouse HW-160 fire control radars. The sonar was upgraded to the Raytheon DE-1191, a digital upgrade of the SQS-23 sonar installed as part of the FRAM upgrade. A quadruple mounting for the Hsiung Feng II anti-ship missile was added amidships by 1995.

Chen Yang served as part of the 146th Frigate squadron. She was decommissioned on 16 December 2003.

On 20 July 2006, she was towed out to sea to be sunk as a target ship off Hualien.
