= USS Catherine Johnson =

1913 freight lighter

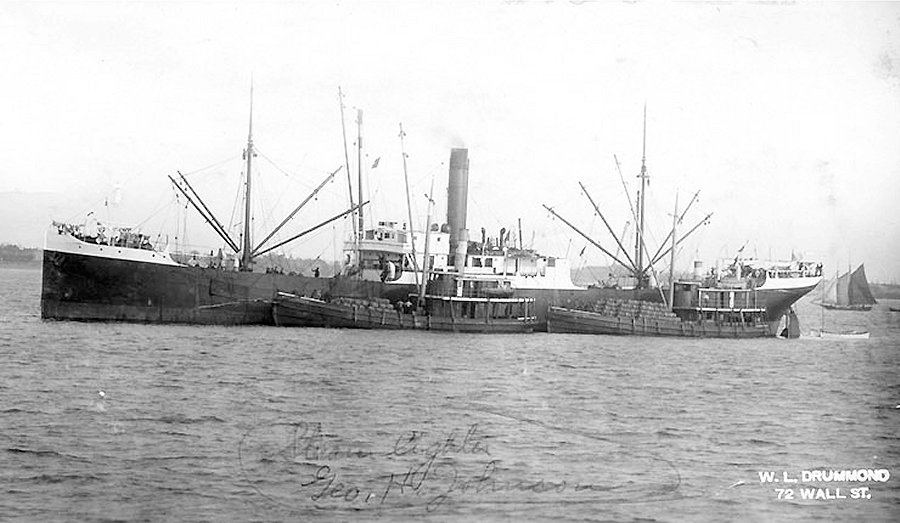
- A pre-World War I photograph of the commercial freight lighters George H. Johnson (left, later considered for U.S. Navy service as USS George H. Johnson (SP-379) but never acquired) and Catherine Johnson (right) loading or unloading barrels while tied up alongside a much larger cargo ship (behind them).

History

United States
- Name: USS Catherine Johnson (1918); Later USS Freight Lighter No. 161; USS YF-161 1920-1930; USS YC-660 1930-1932
- Namesake: Catherine Johnson was her previous name retained; later names were based on her naval designation
- Completed: 1913
- Acquired: 1918
- In service: 15 June 1918
- Out of service: 19 November 1930
- Fate: Sold 29 September 1932
- Notes: Operated as commercial freight lighter Edith B. and Catherine Johnson 1913-1918

General characteristics
- Type: Freight lighter
- Tonnage: 196 gross register tons
- Length: 110 ft (34 m)
- Propulsion: Steam engine

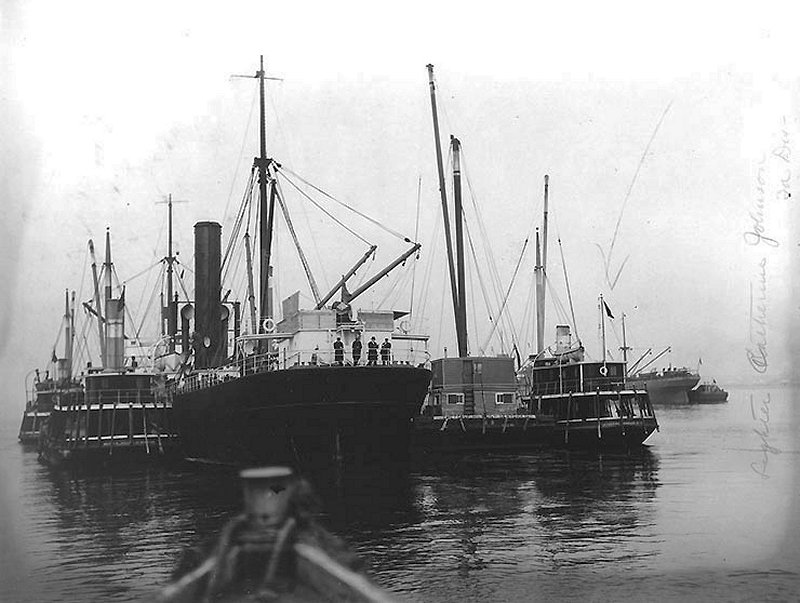
The commercial freight lighters Metcalf No. 1 (left), George H. Johnson (center right, considered for U.S. Navy service as USS George H. Johnson (SP-379) but never acquired) and Catherine Johnson (right) tied up alongside a British cargo ship (center left) on 5 May 1917, probably at New York City.

USS Catherine Johnson (SP-390), later USS Freight Lighter No. 161, later USS YF-161, later USS YC-660, was a freight lighter in commission in the United States Navy from 1918 to 1930.

Catherine Johnson was built as the commercial steam freight lighter Edith B. in 1913. She had been renamed Catherine Johnson by the time the U.S. Navy inspected her in 1917 for possible naval use during World War I and assigned her the section patrol number SP-390. The Navy eventually purchased her and placed her in service as USS Catherine Johnson (SP-390) on 15 June 1918.

Catherine Johnson was assigned to the 3rd Naval District, where she transported supplies for the next 12 years, probably in the New York City area. Her name was changed to Freight Lighter No. 161 sometime before mid-1920. When the U.S. Navy adopted its modern hull number system on 17 July 1920, she received the "freight lighter" classification "YF" and was renamed USS YF-161.

On 19 November 1930, YF-161 was placed out of service. At about the same time, she was reclassified as an "open lighter, non-self-propelled" (YC) and renamed USS YC-660.

YC-660 was sold on 29 September 1932.
