= USS George H. Johnson (SP-379) =

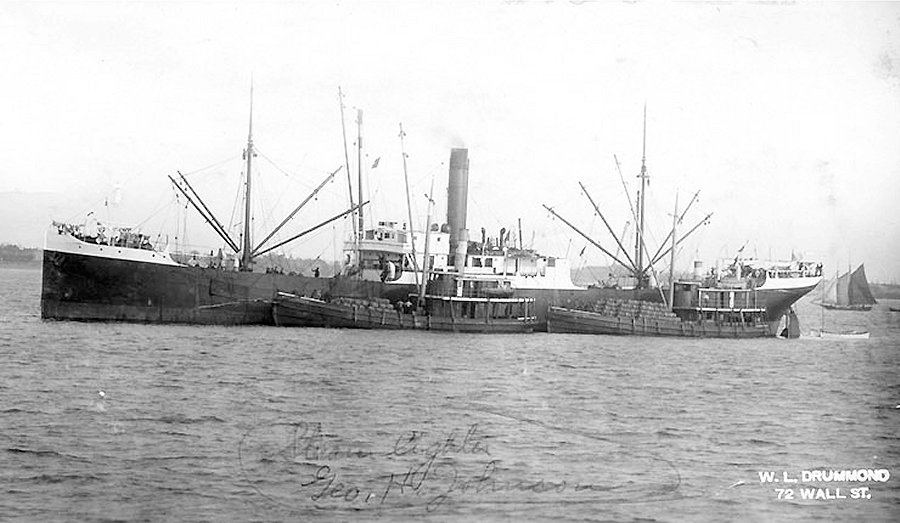
- A pre-World War I photograph of George H. Johnson (left) and Catherine Johnson, (right) loading or unloading barrels.

History

United States
- Name: USS George H. Johnson (proposed)
- Namesake: Previous name retained (proposed)
- Builder: W. G. Abbott, Milford, Delaware
- Completed: 1912
- Acquired: Never
- Commissioned: Never
- Notes: No naval service; operated as commercial freight lighter George H. Johnson

General characteristics
- Type: Patrol vessel (proposed)
- Tonnage: 196 gross register tons
- Length: 110 ft (34 m)

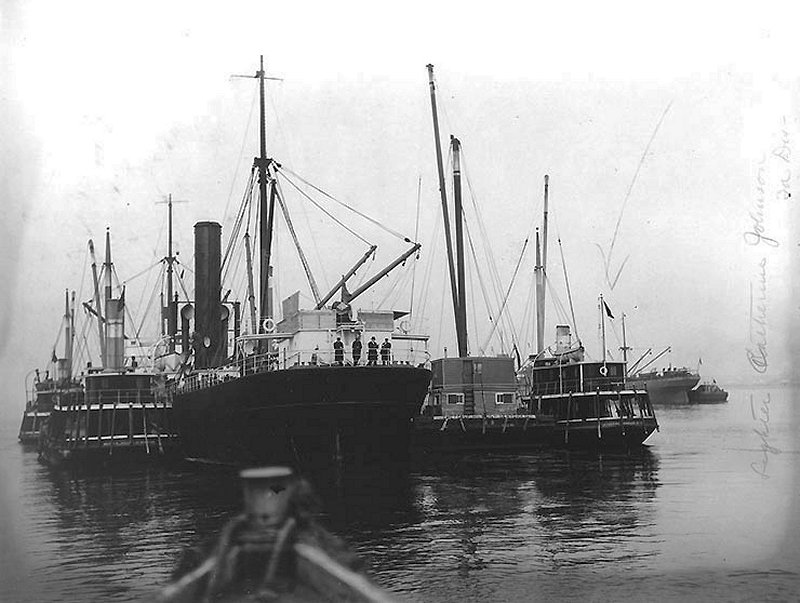
The freight lighters Metcalf No. 1 (left), George H. Johnson (center right), and Catherine Johnson (right) tied up alongside a British cargo ship (center left) on 5 May 1917.

USS George H. Johnson (SP-379) was the proposed name and designation for a freight lighter that the United States Navy considered for World War I naval service but never acquired.

George H. Johnson was built as a commercial freight lighter in 1912 by W. G. Abbott at Milford, Delaware. She was the property of the T. Johnson Company of New York City when the U.S. Navy inspected her in 1916 or early 1917 for possible naval use during World War I. The Navy assigned her the section patrol number SP-379 but never acquired her, and she saw no naval service.
