= John V. Johnston =

American navy officer

John Vincent Johnston (died 23 April 1912) was an American navy officer who fought during the American Civil War from 1861 until 1864 on the Union side.

== Biography ==
Johnston was from Cincinnati, Ohio, and entered the United States Navy, during the American Civil War, in September 1861. He served as First Master on the gunboat St. Louis. He assisted in the Union gunboat attacks that captured strategic Fort Henry on the Tennessee River 6 February 1862. On the night of 1–2 April 1862, he was the naval commander of a combined Army–Navy boat expedition which landed and spiked the guns of the Upper Battery (Battery No. 1) at Madrid Bend (Tennessee shore) across the river from the Confederate stronghold, Island No. 10. He was promoted to Acting Volunteer Lieutenant for gallantry in this expedition. After joining in the bombardments of Vicksburg, Mississippi, he took command of Forest Rose to patrol the Mississippi River and its tributaries. On 15 February 1864, his gunboat repelled the attack of Confederate raiders, keeping them from saving the town of Waterproof, Louisiana, and securing the federal garrison therein. Lt. Johnston resigned from the naval service 23 June 1864 and died 23 April 1912 at St. Louis, Missouri.

== Namesake ==
During World War II two destroyers were named USS Johnston in his honor.
