= 612th Tank Destroyer Battalion =

- Active: 1942-45
- Country: USA
- Branch: Regular Army
- Type: Tank destroyer
- Size: Battalion
- Motto(s): "Get There First With the Biggest Guns"
- Engagements: World War II: Normandy; Northern France; Rhineland; Ardennes-Alsace; Central Europe
- Decorations: Included: Silver Star Medal (10); Bronze Star Medal with Oak Leaf Cluster (3); Bronze Star Medal for Heroic Achievement (30); Bronze Star Medal for Meritorious Service (138); Soldier's Medal (2); Air Medal (1); French Croix de Guerre (2); British Military Medal (1); Belgian Fourragère

The 612th Tank Destroyer Battalion was a unit of the United States Army during World War II. It played an instrumental role in defending Hofen during the Battle of the Bulge. The specialized tank destroyer unit was attached to various organizations during the war. In December, 1944, the twelve 3-inch guns of Company A were integrated into the defensive positions of the 395th Infantry Regiment and were key to keeping the attacking Sixth Panzer Army from gaining essential objectives in the first days of the offensive.

== Organization and training ==
The 612th Tank Destroyer Battalion was activated as a light battalion at Camp Swift, Texas, on 25 June 1942, under the command of Lt. Col. W. A. Hedden. The cadre of two officers and seventy-three enlisted men were from the 631st Tank Destroyer Battalion. All of the tank destroyer battalions used the same logo, that of a panther eating a caterpillar tread. The logo was widely used at Camp Hood where tank destroyer forces were trained, on uniforms, equipment, and official U.S. Army publications.

The Battalion received its men and moved to Camp Bowie, Texas, on 4 December 1942, where they received basic training. Major Joseph M. Deeley assumed command of the battalion on 27 February 1943.

For advanced training as a self-propelled unit, the battalion first moved to Camp Hood, Texas, on 3 March 1943. The battalion moved back to Camp Swift on 14 June 1943 and participated in the Third Army Maneuvers in Louisiana from September to November 1943, then returned to Camp Swift. On 20 December 1943, the battalion was reorganized as a towed battalion utilizing 3-inch guns and on 26 March 1944 traveled to Camp Kilmer, New Jersey, arriving on 29 March 1944. The battalion embarked on the Ile de France, on 5 April 1944, at the New York Port of Embarkation, and sailed on 7 April 1944.

== Arrival on continent ==
After arriving in England, two platoons of Company B were the first elements to sail from England aboard a LST on 12 June, arriving in France on 14 June. They immediately moved into positions on the line in the 2nd Infantry Division sector, with the mission to provide anti-mechanized protection for the Division. The remainder of Headquarters Company, Company A, elements of Company B and Company C arrived on 16 June.

From 20 June to 10 July, the battalion protected the division from anti-mechanized attack, with elements harassing the enemy with high velocity interdiction fire. All during this time the enemy was looking down on the U.S. positions from Hill 192, and kept the U.S. units covered with continual harassing mortar, artillery, and long range machine gun fire.

On 25 June the rear echelon arrived from England, which completed the battalion's presence in Normandy. On 3 July the battalion lost its first member in a combat death.

== Siege of Brest ==
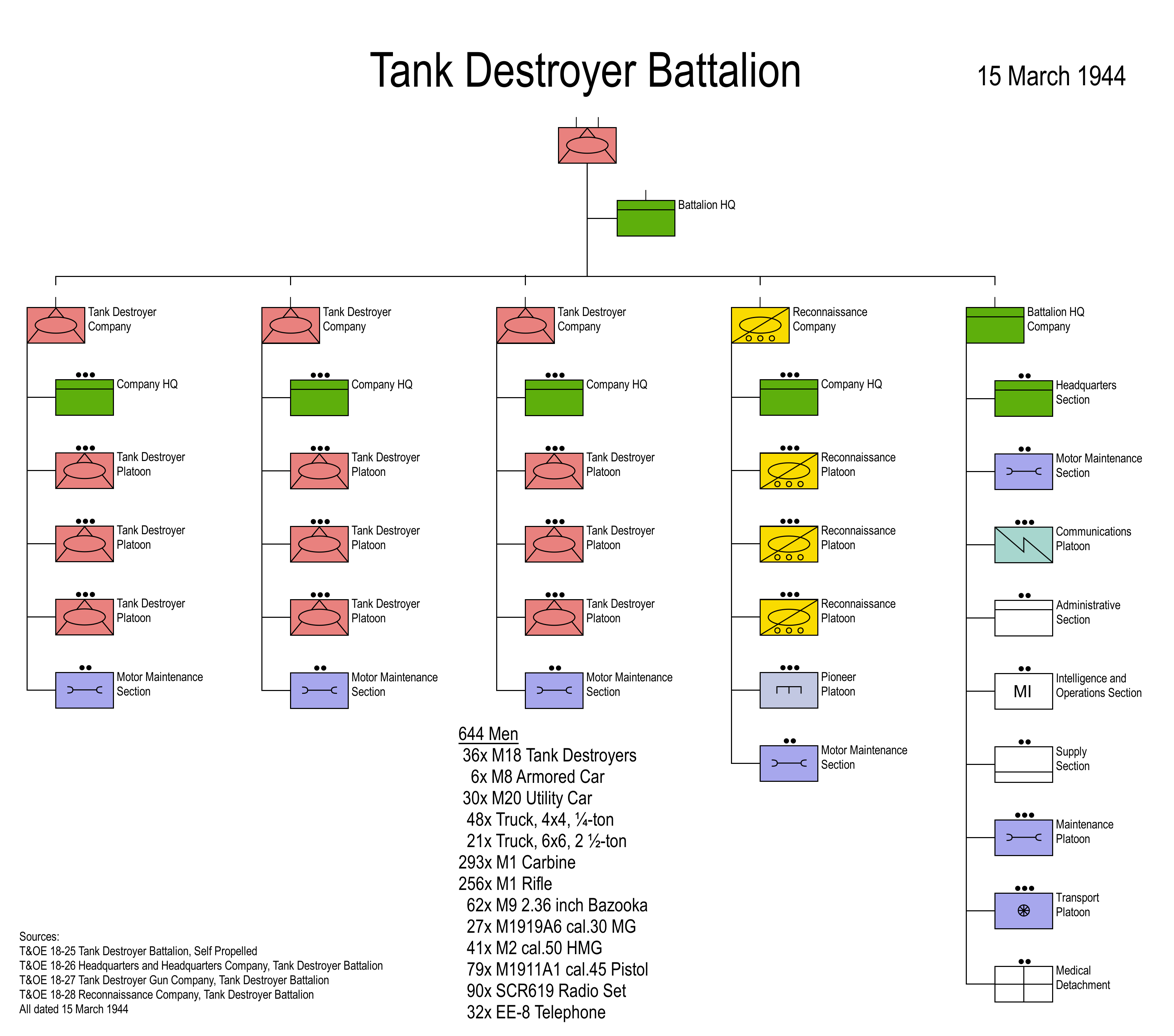
Tank Destroyer Battalion (SP) Structure - March 1944

During August 1944, the battalion participated in the siege of Brest helping to breach the old city walls. The unit was credited with destroying multiple pill boxes, dugouts, machine gun emplacements, an ammunition dump, anti-aircraft guns, large caliber artillery pieces, houses and a large hotel. In destroying these enemy installations and material, the company inflicted more than four hundred casualties upon the enemy.

The battalion then participated in the attack on St. Marc, and although subjected to exceptionally heavy 88mm fire, found it necessary to move to positions fully visible to the Germans so they could place direct fire on German installations. Two platoons entered the city of Brest on 11 September, following closely on the heels of advancing infantry. During the engagement, they received intense sniper fire. Gun crews knocked out a pill box and several enemy observation posts during the day.

Despite heavy counterbattery and sniper fire on all gun positions during the final five days of the siege, the second platoon of Company B fired approximately 200 rounds per day and eliminated a number of pill boxes and other reinforced positions, enabling units of the 29th Infantry Division to steadily move forward. To be effective, tank destroyer guns operated within the front line rifle platoons.

== Defense in Battle of the Bulge ==
On the morning of 27 September, the battalion began a 692 miles (1,114 km) motor march across France and Belgium to Germany. On 13 December 1944, Company A was attached to the 9th Infantry Regimental Combat Team (RCT) and moved to Höfen, Germany to support the planned attack of the 9th RCT with direct fire on Rohren, Germany.

On 15 December the battalion observation post was moved to Wirtzfeld, Belgium to prepare for the attack on the Roer River Dams.

At 5:30 am on 16 December, after a 30-minute cannon and rocket barrage, the 3rd platoon of Company A was attacked by a strong German force which had penetrated the infantry lines. This became one of the decisive actions of the Battle of the Bulge. The battalion's actions during this action resulted in it being recognized with a Presidential Unit Citation. The enemy was driven off by vigorous counterattacks by Company A, fighting as infantry, and the U.S. lines were restored. Many enemy dead were piled up in front of the lines and 21 POWs were taken.

On 17 December, Company B with the 1st Reconnaissance platoon attached, was detached from the 23rd Infantry Regiment, 2nd Infantry Division, and attached to the 99th Infantry Division. It was moved to the vicinity of Honsfeld, Belgium. The Germans attacked from the southwest with tanks and armored infantry and the platoons were surrounded. Three officers and 110 men being reported as missing in action, along with one officer and 18 men of 1st Reconnaissance platoon.

The morning of 17 December, Company C was attached to the 99th Infantry Division, but on the same day at 2:00 pm was reassigned to the 26th Infantry Regiment of the 1st Infantry Division, and took up defensive positions at Butgenbach, Belgium. Later this day the remnants of Company B were relieved from attachment to the 99th Infantry Division and placed in direct support of the 23rd Infantry Regiment.

Company A was again attacked at Höfen by an enemy force estimated to be about one regiment in size, but they were successfully beaten back. Company C was relieved from attachment to the 26th Infantry Regiment and placed in support of the 38th Infantry Regiment of the 2nd Infantry Division, and took up defensive positions east of Wirtzfeld on 19 December. In Höfen, Company A was attacked by strong enemy forces, and again they repulsed the attack. Eleven men were reported missing in action.

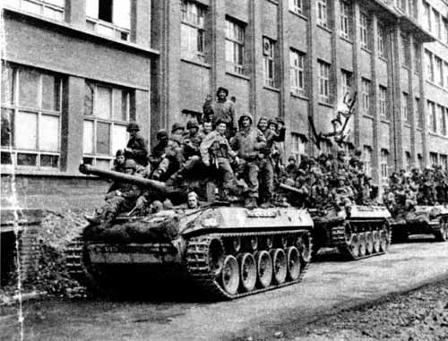
"A" Company, 612th Tank Destroyer battalion, carrying troops of the 9th Infantry Regiment, 2nd Infantry Division.

The battalion forward moved to Elsenborn Ridge to the 99th Division Advance Command Post, where Lt. Col. Deeley took command of anti-tank defenses of the 99th Infantry Division on 20 December. On 21 December, Company A had engaged German paratroopers, part of a failed German reinforcement plan. At the end of the year Company A and Company B were relieved from their positions and were converted to self-propelled M-18 tank destroyers in the vicinity of Verviers, Belgium. Company C continued to maintaining its position east of Berg.

== Central Europe campaign ==
On 6 March, the battalion jumped-off on the drive for the Rhine. Traveling from the Roer River dams they encountered little resistance, most in the form of road blocks and scattered mines. There were isolated instances of stubbornly defended towns where machine guns, Panzerfaust teams, and Hitler Youth, along with some Volkssturm, slowed down the drive until the infantry dismounted and cleared the towns while the tanks and destroyers covered them with fire.

Continuing the pursuit along the Roer River valley to the Rhine, the companies targeted retreating columns of Germans, often overrun by speeding U.S. troops. On 11 March the battalion reached the Rhine in the vicinity of Sinzig. The companies deployed to protect the famed Remagen Bridge from enemy attack from the water, firing at boats and floating debris suspected of containing demolitions, and boat loads of enemy escaping across the river. Guns were sited to engage enemy targets across the Rhine. Company C was with the 38th Infantry protecting the south flank of the First Army against an enemy thrust at the bridge from the south.

Company A, Company C and Headquarters crossed the Rhine on 21 March, and the battalion command post was established at Honningen. Company C further attached to Combat Command A of the 9th Armored Division drove along with the combat command up the Rhine and then eastwards through Langscheid, Rechtenbach, Bernfeld, and Homberg. The U.S. 2nd Reconnaissance platoon acted as advance point for the spearhead on the drive to Paderborn, closing in the Ruhr Pocket.

However, on 2 May the battalion began a 209 miles (336 km) march into Czechoslovakia, where they relieved elements of the extended Third United States Army in the vicinity of Waldmünchen, Germany. The entire distance was covered in one day through a May snow storm, traveling on the Autobahn to Bayreuth, and east toward the Czechoslovak border.

== Post-war occupation duty ==
The war ended for the battalion after 10 months and 23 days of fighting across Europe – from Normandy to Plzeň, Czechoslovakia. They had expended 40,149 rounds of 3-inch ammunition, traveled 1,936 miles (3,116 km), taking 742 enemy prisoners and killing 1145. They were credited with knocking out 57 machine gun nests, 65 vehicles of all types, 11 tanks and 27 guns from anti aircraft to 6 inch Naval guns. U.S. units held like a stone wall at Höfen, assisting in stopping the German breakthrough in the Ardennes, and fought across Germany on the spearhead.

== Commendations and recognition ==
The unit was awarded the following decorations:

- Belgian Fouragere 1940, for the period 20 Dec 44 – 26 Jan 45
- Cited in the Order of the Day of the Belgian Army for action in the Ardennes (Company A cited for period 20 Dec 1944–26 Jan 1945
- Cited in the Order of the Day of the Belgian Army for action at Elsenborn Crest (612th TD Bn cited for period 13–19 Dec 1944
- Cited in the Order of the Day of the Belgian Army for action in the Ardennes (612th TD Bn cited for period 19–20 Dec 1944

Different sources give conflicting information about whether the 612th was awarded a Presidential Unit Citation for their stand at Höfen, Belgium in the battle of the Ardennes. The 612th Tank Destroyer Battalion Association quotes the text of a possible commendation, but no official government record has been found. Lt. Col. McClernand Butler, commanding officer of the 3rd Battalion, 395th Infantry Regiment, wrote a summary of the unit's action and recommended them for a commendation, which was endorsed and forwarded by Lt. Col Joseph M Deeley. Butler's recommendation included the text of the citation quoted by the unit's association web site.

Butler's recommendation for a unit commendation was forwarded up the chain of command to Col. George W. Smythe, commanding officer of the 47th Infantry Division, to which Company A of the 612th had been attached. On 6 March 1945, Smythe wrote that singling out a single unit for meritorious conduct during the battle would be "unfair to the other units participating in the defense" and, "in view of its [Company A's] small losses," he disapproved the award. His decision was supported by 2nd Infantry Division Headquarters and commanding general of V Corps. On 5 April 1945, Col. S. E. Senior of V Corps HQ, writing for commander of the First Army, Major General Courtney Hodges, responded that the actions of the unit, "while meritorious, is not sufficient to justify the award of the unit citation."

=== Campaign participation ===
The 612th was authorized to wear five Bronze Stars on its European Theater of Operations Service Ribbon, signifying its participation in the five major campaigns on the European Theater of Operations:

- Normandy
- Northern France
- Rhineland
- Ardennes-Alsace
- Central Europe
