= Richard Cowan (soldier) =

American World War II Medal of Honor recipient

Richard Eller Cowan
- Medal of Honor recipient
- Born: December 5, 1922; Lincoln, Nebraska, US
- Died: December 17, 1944 (aged 22) near Krinkelter Wald, Belgium
- Burial place: Wichita Park Cemetery, Wichita, Kansas
- Military career
- Allegiance: United States
- Branch: United States Army
- Service years: 1943 - 1944
- Rank: Private First Class
- Units: 23rd Infantry Regiment, 2nd Infantry Division
- Conflicts: World War II: Battle of the Bulge; Battle of Elsenborn Ridge
- Awards: Medal of Honor; Purple Heart

Richard Eller Cowan (December 5, 1922 – December 17, 1944) was a soldier in the United States Army who posthumously received the United States military's highest decoration, the Medal of Honor, for his actions during World War II.

He was born in Lincoln, Nebraska and after growing up and going to college in Wichita, Kansas he enlisted in the Army. He was sent to Europe to fight in World War II and was killed in the Battle of the Bulge after killing approximately 100 German soldiers. It was for this action that he received the Medal of Honor, which was presented to his family by President Harry Truman at a White House ceremony.

== Early life and education ==
Cowan was born December 5, 1922, in Lincoln, Nebraska but grew up in Wichita, Kansas. After attending school in Wichita he transferred from Friends University in Wichita, Kansas, his hometown, to Oberlin College, in October 1942. His father, grandfather, and uncles were all graduates of Oberlin College, and his greatest wish was to be the third Cowan generation at Oberlin.

== Military career ==
Cowan joined the Army from his hometown of Wichita, Kansas in September 1943.

At the time of his death, Cowan was a 22-year-old private first class in M Company, 23rd Infantry, Second Infantry Division. On December 17, 1944, the second day of the Battle of the Bulge, the last great German effort to split the Allied front and reach the English Channel, he was a heavy machine gunner attached to I Company near Krinkelter Wald, Belgium. The company was attacked by a superior force of Wehrmacht infantry and tanks. Cowan and his comrades repulsed the first six waves of attacking German infantry, but a seventh drive with tanks killed or wounded all but three of his section, leaving Dick to man his gun supported by only 15 or 20 riflemen. He stood his ground, holding off the Germans until the rest of his force could set up a new line behind him. Then, unaided, he moved his heavy weapon and ammunition to the second position. A King Tiger tank approached, but he held his fire until 80 or so supporting German infantry broke cover. His first burst of fire killed or wounded half of them. The tank fired its 88 mm cannon, rocking his position. He continued to man his gun, pouring a deadly fire into the German ranks. Barely missed by another shell from the tank and fire from three German machine guns and a rocket, he stood by his gun. Finally, after he had killed an estimated one hundred of the enemy, his position became untenable.

Cowan lifted the heavy gun on his back and escaped into the village of Krinkelt. Out of ammunition and too exhausted to carry the gun, he received permission to destroy it. He then picked up a rifle and joined other infantry in defending the town. He was killed by enemy fire the next day on December 17, 1944.

President Harry S. Truman gave Cowan's Medal of Honor to his parents in a ceremony on the White House lawn, marking their son's heroic exploits in the Ardennes campaign. Cowan is the only known Oberlin College recipient of the Medal of Honor.

== Medal of Honor citation ==
Rank and organization: Private First Class, U.S. Army, Company M, 23d Infantry, 2d Infantry Division. Place and date: Near Krinkelter Wald, Belgium, 17 December 1944. Entered service at: Wichita, Kans. Birth: Lincoln, Nebr. G.O. No.: 48, 23 June 1945.

Citation:

He was a heavy machinegunner in a section attached to Company I in the vicinity of Krinkelter Wald, Belgium, 17 December 1944, when that company was attacked by a numerically superior force of German infantry and tanks. The first 6 waves of hostile infantrymen were repulsed with heavy casualties, but a seventh drive with tanks killed or wounded all but 3 of his section, leaving Pvt. Cowan to man his gun, supported by only 15 to 20 riflemen of Company I. He maintained his position, holding off the Germans until the rest of the shattered force had set up a new line along a firebreak. Then, unaided, he moved his machinegun and ammunition to the second position. At the approach of a Royal Tiger tank, he held his fire until about 80 enemy infantrymen supporting the tank appeared at a distance of about 150 yards. His first burst killed or wounded about half of these infantrymen. His position was rocked by an 88mm. shell when the tank opened fire, but he continued to man his gun, pouring deadly fire into the Germans when they again advanced. He was barely missed by another shell. Fire from three machineguns and innumerable small arms struck all about him; an enemy rocket shook him badly, but did not drive him from his gun. Infiltration by the enemy had by this time made the position untenable, and the order was given to withdraw. Pvt. Cowan was the last man to leave, voluntarily covering the withdrawal of his remaining comrades. His heroic actions were entirely responsible for allowing the remaining men to retire successfully from the scene of their last-ditch stand.

== See also ==
- List of Medal of Honor recipients for World War II
