= William A. Soderman =

William Adolph Soderman
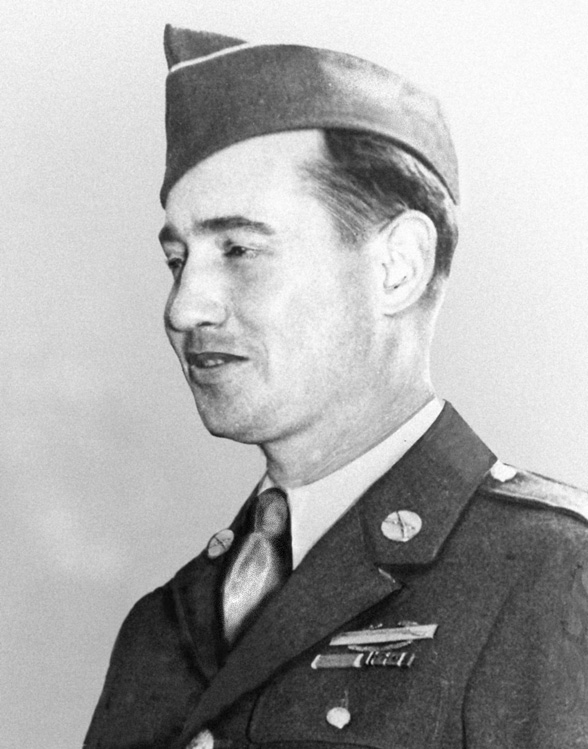
- Private First Class William Soderman
- Born: March 20, 1912; West Haven, Connecticut, US
- Died: October 20, 1980 (aged 68); West Haven, Connecticut, US
- Burial place: Oak Grove Cemetery, West Haven, Connecticut
- Military career
- Allegiance: United States
- Branch: United States Army
- Rank: Private First Class
- Units: 9th Infantry Regiment, 2nd Infantry Division
- Conflicts: World War II; *Battle of the Bulge
- Awards: Medal of Honor; Purple Heart; American Campaign Medal; European–African–Middle Eastern Campaign Medal; World War II Victory Medal

William Adolph Soderman (March 20, 1912 – October 20, 1980) was a United States Army soldier and a recipient of the United States military's highest decoration—the Medal of Honor—for his actions during the Battle of the Bulge in World War II.

== Biography ==
Soderman joined the Army from his birth city of West Haven, Connecticut, in August 1943, and by December 17, 1944, was serving as a private first class in Company K, 9th Infantry Regiment, 2nd Infantry Division. On that day, near Rocherath, Belgium, Soderman used his bazooka to single-handedly disable three German tanks and attack an infantry platoon. Although seriously wounded, he survived the battle and was awarded the Medal of Honor eleven months later, on November 1, 1945.

Soderman left the Army while still a private first class. He married Virginia Rae Leake and had two children, Peter William Soderman, and Susan Louise Soderman. He was proud of a long career working at the Veterans Affairs hospital in West Haven. He died at age 68 and was buried at Oak Grove Cemetery in his hometown of West Haven.

== Medal of Honor citation ==
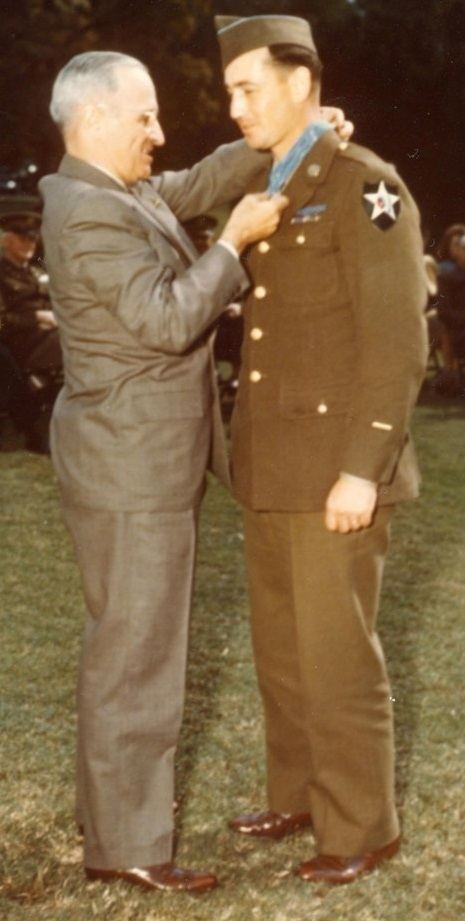
Pfc William A. Soderman receives the MOH on the White House lawn, 12 October 1945

Private First Class Soderman's official Medal of Honor citation reads:

Armed with a bazooka, he defended a key road junction near Rocherath, Belgium, on 17 December 1944, during the German Ardennes counteroffensive. After a heavy artillery barrage had wounded and forced the withdrawal of his assistant, he heard enemy tanks approaching the position where he calmly waited in the gathering darkness of early evening until the 5 Mark V tanks which made up the hostile force were within pointblank range. He then stood up, completely disregarding the firepower that could be brought to bear upon him, and launched a rocket into the lead tank, setting it afire and forcing its crew to abandon it as the other tanks pressed on before Pfc. Soderman could reload. The daring bazookaman remained at his post all night under severe artillery, mortar, and machinegun fire, awaiting the next onslaught, which was made shortly after dawn by 5 more tanks. Running along a ditch to meet them, he reached an advantageous point and there leaped to the road in full view of the tank gunners, deliberately aimed his weapon and disabled the lead tank. The other vehicles, thwarted by a deep ditch in their attempt to go around the crippled machine, withdrew. While returning to his post Pfc. Soderman, braving heavy fire to attack an enemy infantry platoon from close range, killed at least 3 Germans and wounded several others with a round from his bazooka. By this time, enemy pressure had made Company K's position untenable. Orders were issued for withdrawal to an assembly area, where Pfc. Soderman was located when he once more heard enemy tanks approaching. Knowing that elements of the company had not completed their disengaging maneuver and were consequently extremely vulnerable to an armored attack, he hurried from his comparatively safe position to meet the tanks. Once more he disabled the lead tank with a single rocket, his last; but before he could reach cover, machinegun bullets from the tank ripped into his right shoulder. Unarmed and seriously wounded he dragged himself along a ditch to the American lines and was evacuated. Through his unfaltering courage against overwhelming odds, Pfc. Soderman contributed in great measure to the defense of Rocherath, exhibiting to a superlative degree the intrepidity and heroism with which American soldiers met and smashed the savage power of the last great German offensive.

== See also ==
- USNS Soderman (T-AKR-317)
- List of Medal of Honor recipients
