= 631st Tank Destroyer Battalion =

- Active: 1941–1945
- Disbanded: 1945
- Country: United States
- Allegiance: Army
- Part of: Independent unit
- Equipment: 3" anti-tank guns

The 631st Tank Destroyer Battalion was a tank destroyer battalion of the United States Army active during the Second World War.

The battalion, originally composed of troops from the 31st Infantry Division, was activated on 15 December 1941 as part of the general reorganisation of the anti-tank force. It deployed into Normandy on 31 August 1944, equipped with towed 3" anti-tank guns, and spent the next eight months on rear-area security duties with Third Army. It did not see combat before the end of the war.
