= 326th Infantry Division =

- Country: Nazi Germany
- Branch: Army
- Type: Infantry
- Size: Division
- Engagements: World War II

The 326th Infantry Division (326. Infanterie-Division) was the only Eastern Front (Ost Front) veteran division to have fought in the battles of Normandy. It was formed on November 9, 1942, shortly after its return from Southern Russia to serve as an occupation force in France. On May 5, 1943, the division was transformed into a static division. It was commanded by Karl Boettcher from 8 May, until forced to relinquish it through ill health on 31 May. His replacement, Lieutenant-General Viktor von Drabich-Wachter was killed in action on 2 August 1944. The 326th Infantry Division was destroyed during the Battle of Normandy.

In Autumn 1944 its new commander Major-General Erwin Kaschner moved the remnants of the division to Hungary. A new 326th Volksgrenadier Division (326. Volksgrenadier-Division) was formed on September 4, 1944, in Galanta by redesignation of the new 579th Volksgrenadier Division of the 32nd mobilisation wave. The division returned to the western front in mid-December 1944 and in early 1945 fought against the American V Corps in the Battles of the Roer River. Later the division, separated into two groups, entered U.S. captivity in the Ruhr Pocket and Harz respectively.

== Operational history ==
The 326th Infantry Division spent its entire operational history on the Western Front, taking part in the Battles of Normandy under Army Group D (Heeresgruppe D) and the Ardennes under Army Group B (Heeresgruppe B).

== Organisation ==
=== 1942 ===
- Grenadier-Regiment 751, I-III Battalions
- Grenadier-Regiment 752, I-III Battalions
- Grenadier-Regiment 753, I-III Battalions
- Artillerie-Regiment 326, I-III Battalions
- Schnelle-Abteilung 326
- Pionier-Bataillon 326
- Infanterie-Divisions-Nachrichten-Abteilung 326

=== 1944 ===
- Grenadier-Regiment 751, I and II Battalions
- Grenadier-Regiment 752, I and II Battalions
- Grenadier-Regiment 753, I and II Battalions
- Artillerie-Regiment 326, I-IV Battalions
- Divisions-Füsilier-Kompanie 326 (later expanded to Füsilier-Bataillon 26)
- Panzer-Jäger-Abteilung 326
- Pionier-Bataillon 326
- Infanterie-Divisions-Nachrichten-Abteilung 326

== Commanding officers ==
- Lieutenant General Friedrich von Drabich-Waechter (1944)
- Major General Dr. Erwin Kaschner (1945)
- Lieutenant General Friedrich
