= Hugo Kraas =

German SS commander during World War II

Hugo Gottfried Kraas
- Born: 25 January 1911; Witten, German Empire
- Died: 20 February 1980 (aged 69); Selk, West Germany
- Military career
- Allegiance: Nazi Germany
- Branch: Waffen-SS
- Service years: 1935–1945
- Rank: SS-Brigadeführer
- Commands: SS Division Hitlerjugend
- Awards: Knight's Cross of the Iron Cross with Oak Leaves

Signature
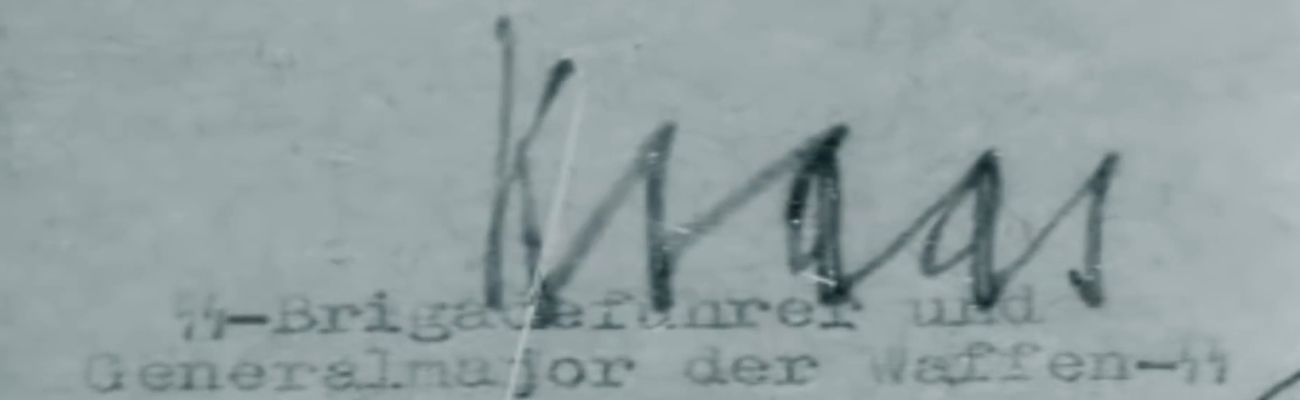

Hugo Gottfried Kraas (25 January 1911 – 20 February 1980) was a German SS commander during World War II. He served in the Leibstandarte SS Adolf Hitler and was the last commander of the SS Division Hitlerjugend. Kraas was a recipient of the Knight's Cross of the Iron Cross with Oak Leaves. Following the war, Kraas was investigated by Italian and West German authorities for the murder of Italian Jews in 1943.

== Career ==
Born in 1911, Kraas became a member of the Nazi Party and the Sturmabteilung (SA) in 1934; in 1938 he was posted to the Leibstandarte SS Adolf Hitler (LSSAH). With the LSSAH, Kraas took part in the invasion of Poland where he was awarded the Iron Cross second class. He was awarded the Iron Cross first class following the Battle of the Netherlands. He took part in the Balkan Campaign and Operation Barbarossa, the invasion of the Soviet Union. In December 1941, Kraas received the German Cross in Gold. In 1943, he took part in the Third Battle of Kharkov. For his role in this operation he was awarded the Knight's Cross of the Iron Cross in March 1943. He received the Oak Leaves to the Knight's Cross in January 1944. Kraas died in 1980.

== War crimes ==
Along with other members of LSSAH, Kraas was investigated for the murder of several dozens of Italian Jews on 25 September 1943 in Italy. He was tried in absentia in Italy in 1955 and was found guilty. The investigation also took place in West Germany in 1965 but stalled for "lack of evidence". According to a report in 2020, Kraas remained a convinced supporter of Nazism until his death. He was an active member of HIAG, a lobbyist group for Waffen-SS veterans.

== Awards ==
- Iron Cross (1939) 2nd Class (16 October 1939) & 1st Class (25 May 1940)
- German Cross in Gold on 26 December 1941 as SS-Hauptsturmführer in the Aufklärungs-Abteilung "Leibstandarte SS Adolf Hitler"
- Knight's Cross of the Iron Cross with Oak Leaves
  - Knight's Cross on 28 March 1943 as SS-Sturmbannführer and commander of the I./2. SS-Panzergrenadier-Regiment/Panzergrenadier-Division "Leibstandarte SS Adolf Hitler"
  - Oak Leaves on 24 January 1944 as SS-Obersturmbannführer and commander of SS-Panzergrenadier-Regiment 2 "Leibstandarte SS Adolf Hitler"

Military offices
Preceded by SS-Brigadeführer Fritz Kraemer	Commander of 12th SS Panzer Division Hitlerjugend; 13 November 1944 – 8 May 1945	Succeeded by dissolved on 8 May 1945
