= The Longest Winter =

2004 book by Alex Kershaw

- Author: Alex Kershaw
- Publisher: Da Capo Press
- Publication date: 2004
- ISBN: 0-306-81304-1

The Longest Winter: The Battle of the Bulge and the Epic Story of World War II's Most Decorated Platoon is a non-fiction book written by Alex Kershaw and published in 2004 by Da Capo Press. It became a New York Times bestseller.

It tells the story of the eighteen men of an intelligence platoon under the command by Lieutenant Lyle Bouck. Placed in a front-line position, the soldiers fought fiercely outside the village of Lansareth to prevent the German advance on the morning of the Battle of the Bulge.

== Platoon's actions ==
The Intelligence and Reconnaissance Platoon from the 394th Infantry Regiment of the 99th Infantry Division was the most decorated platoon of World War II for action on the first morning of the Battle of the Bulge defending a key road in the vicinity of the Losheim Gap. Led by 20-year-old Lieutenant Lyle Bouck Jr., the unit of 18 men and four forward artillery observers held off an entire German battalion of over 500 men during a 20-hour-long fight, inflicting about 96 casualties on the Germans. The platoon seriously disrupted the entire German Sixth Panzer Army's schedule of attack along the northern edge of the offensive. At 1630 on 16 December, about 50 German paratroopers finally flanked the platoon and captured the remaining 15 soldiers. Two who had been sent on foot to regimental headquarters to seek reinforcements were captured, and a third was killed.

All fifteen survived imprisonment as prisoners of war. Due to their capture, the blur of events during the first week of this massive campaign, and their release and return home, the U.S. Army was not aware of the platoon's actions for thirty-seven years. A book by John S. D. Eisenhower, The Bitter Woods, which described the actions of the unit in detail, help bring attention to the unit's actions that day.

On January 15, 1981, the entire platoon was recognized by Secretary of the Army John O. Marsh with a Presidential Unit Citation, and every member of the platoon was decorated, including four Distinguished Service Crosses, five Silver Stars, and ten Bronze Stars with V for Valor, making the platoon America's most decorated of World War II.

== Bibliography ==
- Kershaw, Alex (Dec 2004). The Longest Winter. Da Capo Press. ISBN 0-306-81304-1.
