= Lyle Bouck =

American lieutenant

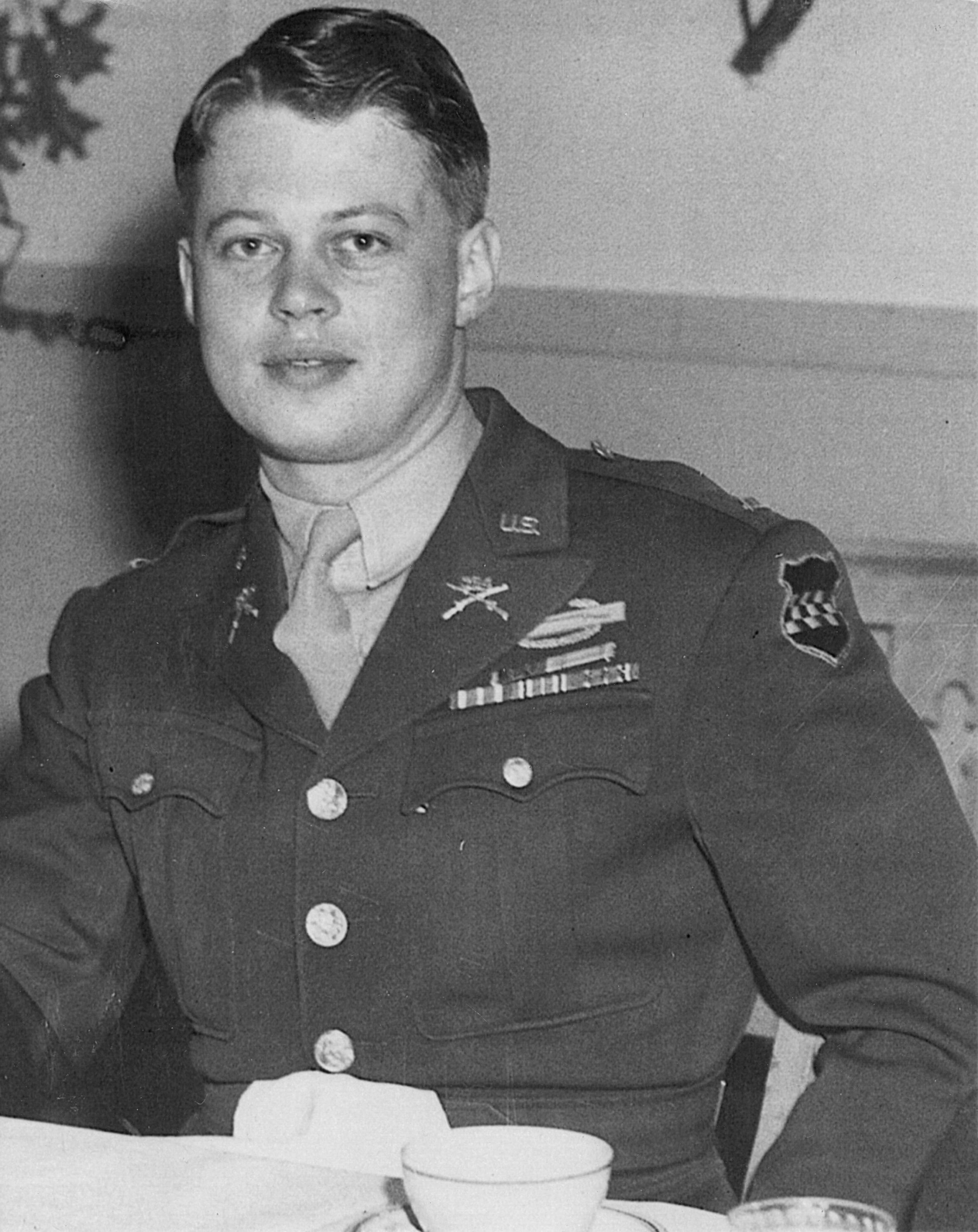
- First Lt. Lyle Joseph Bouck, Jr.
- Born: December 17, 1923; Fenton, Missouri, US
- Died: December 2, 2016 (aged 92); Sunset Hills, Missouri, US
- Height: 5 ft 9 in (175 cm)
Lyle Bouck
- Allegiance: United States of America
- Branch: United States Army
- Service years: 1939–1945
- Rank: Captain
- Service number: ASN: 0-1291400
- Commands: Intelligence and Reconnaissance Platoon, 394th Infantry Regiment, 99th Infantry Division
- Conflicts: World War II: Battle of the Bulge (POW); Central Europe
- Awards: Distinguished Service Cross; Silver Star
- Other work: Chiropractor

Lyle Joseph Bouck Jr. (December 17, 1923 – December 2, 2016) enlisted in the Missouri National Guard at age 14. During World War II, he was a 20-year-old lieutenant in charge of the Intelligence and Reconnaissance Platoon, 394th Infantry Regiment, 99th Infantry Division. On the first morning of the Germans' advance during the Battle of the Bulge, his 18-man unit along with four forward artillery observers held off an entire German battalion of more than 500 men for nearly an entire day, killing or wounding 92, and significantly delayed the German advance in a vital sector of the northern front. Every single member of the platoon was later decorated, making it one of the most decorated platoons in all of World War II. Bouck was one of the youngest commissioned officers in the U.S. Army.

== Early life and enlistment ==
Bouck was born in St. Louis, Missouri, the second child of Lyle Joseph and Magdalen M. Bouck. His father, a private first class in the U.S. Army during World War I, was a carpenter and Bouck grew up during the Depression, moving frequently with his family. Bouck and his four siblings, Robert, Bernice, Eugene and John, often lived in homes with only one bedroom and no indoor plumbing or electricity. Bouck enlisted in the Headquarters Company, 138th Infantry Regiment of the Missouri National Guard at age 14 so he could earn one dollar per drill day to help his family. He was never asked his age. He was rapidly promoted to supply sergeant at age 16, making more than most of his civilian friends.

== Active duty ==
On December 23, 1940, the 35th Infantry Division was activated for one year of federal duty. His unit participated in the Texas-Louisiana maneuvers of 1941. Bouck was assigned responsibility as transportation sergeant for the regimental Headquarters Company and performed very well. While attending a transportation course, and just before their federal duty was completed, the Japanese attacked Pearl Harbor. Their active duty status was indefinitely extended and Bouck's unit was sent to protect California against a possible enemy invasion.

When his unit was subsequently moved to advance duty on the Aleutian Islands in May 1942, he decided to volunteer to attend Officer Candidate School, the newly created Parachute School, or the Army Air Corps. An offer to attend Officer Candidate School arrived first, and Bouck was transferred to Fort Benning, Georgia for four months of intensive training. On his first day there, he was ordered to drill his men. Bouck performed well enough to draw the attention of his commanding officers. He graduated fourth in his class of 57 officers on August 25, 1942. The top ten graduates of each class were retained to teach the next class at Fort Benning, and Bouck was assigned to teach small unit defensive tactics. He spent a year at the school before he was transferred and assigned to the 99th Infantry Division for deployment to Europe.

=== Movement to Europe ===
His division arrived at Le Havre in early November, 1944. By mid-November, without any battle experience, they were in the Ardennes, where they relieved the 60th Regiment, 9th Infantry Division. For the next few weeks his reconnaissance platoon established and maintained regimental listening and observation posts and gathered information. As they were not trained for direct combat, they were kept from direct engagement with the Germans. Bouck earned the Combat Infantryman Badge during this period. The platoon consisted of two nine-man reconnaissance squads and a seven-man headquarters section who worked in the 394th regimental S2 section. Their mission was to conduct reconnaissance up to and through the German lines, including missions to capture German soldiers, to obtain intelligence about the enemy forces' disposition.

=== Battle near Lanzerath ===
The Intelligence and Reconnaissance Platoon attached to the 394th Infantry Regiment of the 99th division was the most decorated platoon of World War II for action on the first morning of the Battle of the Bulge defending a key road in the vicinity of the Losheim Gap. Led by Bouck, the second youngest man in the unit, the unit of 18 men along with four U.S. Forward Artillery Observers from Battery C, 371st Field Artillery, held off an entire German battalion of over 500 men during a 23-hour-long fight, inflicting 92 casualties on the Germans. The platoon seriously disrupted the entire Sixth Panzer Army's schedule of attack along the northern edge of the offensive. At dusk on 16 December, the remaining German paratroopers finally able to make ground against the American's due to the platoon's Browning M2 .50 caliber machine gun melting from overheat and being low on ammo advanced on the platoon and captured the remaining 24 soldiers and a member of the forward artillery observation platoon assisting the platoon who was killed.

Due to the capture of the platoon's soldiers and the blur of events during the first week of this massive campaign, the U.S. Army did not recognize the platoon for its courageous deeds for 37 years. On October 25, 1981, the entire platoon was recognized with a Presidential Unit Citation, and every member of the platoon was decorated, including four Distinguished Service Crosses, five Silver Stars, and ten Bronze Stars with V for Valor.

=== Prisoners of war ===
The I&R platoon members who were able to walk were sent east into Germany. After two days of walking through the cold, Bouck and the remainder of his platoon were loaded into a boxcar in the village of Junkerath. Bouck was jammed into a single railroad cattle car with 71 other POWs and traveled for days without food or water. By Christmas Day, seven men in Bouck's car had died and the rest were barely hanging on. The prisoners were transported to hospitals in Frankfurt and Hanover. Their unmarked trains were prime targets for Allied aircraft, who attacked the train on December 21, killing and wounding several POWs. The POWs were allowed off the train only once, and were given only a few slices of bread and some water to drink during the entire trip.

Infantry of the 19th Armored Infantry Bn., U.S. 14th Armored Division during the successful drive to Hammelburg on April 5, 1945. They are supported by M4 medium tanks from the 47th Tank Battalion.

Bouck and his men were finally imprisoned in Stalag XIII-D in Nuremberg and later in Stalag XIII-C in Hammelburg, where the non-commissioned and enlisted men were split, with the officers sent to Oflag XIII-B. Cpl. Sam Jenkins and PFC Preston were captured before they reached Allied lines, and they later joined Bouck and the rest of the platoon in the POW camps. The men barely survived, most suffering from the advanced effects of malnutrition. When Task Force Baum from Patton's 4th Armored Division raided the camp, Bouck pretended to be a field grade officer and accompanied the task force as it attempted to return to the front lines. However, almost the entire task force was captured or killed, and Bouck was wounded and returned to the camp. He was transferred to Nürnberg and then Moosburg, where he spent the remainder of the war. When he was freed one week before the war ended, he weighed only 114 pounds (52 kg) and had contracted hepatitis. He was hospitalized in Reims and then to Paris. In mid-June, he flew to the U.S. and eventually was hospitalized at O'Reilly General Hospital in Springfield, Missouri, before he was released home.

== Aftermath ==
Bouck considered the wounding of most of his men and the capture of his entire unit a failure. He only later learned that his platoon had delayed the lead German infantry elements from advancing for an entire day, causing armored units to back up behind them for miles and disrupting the Germans' timetable. At the end of the fight, exhausted from more than 15 hours of continuous combat, out of contact with their division, and out of ammunition, after Bouck and most of his men had been wounded, the platoon was overrun by German soldiers. The remaining 15 men were captured and were prisoners of war in freezing, disease-infested prison camps for five months until the war ended, and were near death when their own Army division freed them.

Sepp Dietrich commanded the Sixth Panzer Army. He charged his best colonel Obersturmbannführer Joachim Peiper commander of a Kampfgruppe from the 1st SS Panzer Division Leibstandarte SS Adolf Hitler, with leading the push to Antwerp. The Kampfgruppe included units of the 1st SS Panzer Regiment, reconnaissance, infantry, and associated elements of the division, and the 501st Heavy Panzer Battalion, which was equipped with a mix of Tiger and King Tiger tanks. The German plan called for units to reach the Meuse River on the first day, but Peiper's units did not reach Lanzerath until just after midnight. It had been delayed twelve hours by horrendously snarled road traffic, blown bridges, and ultimately, the tenacious defense of Bouck and his soldiers. The eighteen men's day-long battle not only prevented the German infantry from advancing, but held up the entire 6th Panzer Army behind them. Instead of reaching the Meuse River on the battle's first day, the Germans went almost nowhere. The entire northern wing of the German attack fell hopelessly behind schedule, never to recover.

Author Alex Kershaw said, "Had they not stood and held the Germans and halted their attack, or rather postponed it for a crucial 24 hours, the Battle of the Bulge would have been a great German victory." Bouck attributed the unit's success to the fact that all of his men were expert marksmen. The excellent defensive terrain, the extra weapons Bouck acquired, and their prepared and well-concealed defensive positions contributed significantly to the massively disproportionate casualties they inflicted on the Germans. The inadequately trained and inexperienced German troops also attacked across an open field in waves that made them easy targets for Bouck and his men.

Because of their capture and the general chaos of the Battle of the Bulge, the unit's story was not well known. When Lt. Bouck was freed as a prisoner of war, he was too weak to file a combat report, and didn't think much of what the men had done. "We were in those foxholes and...what we did was to defend ourselves and try to live through it."

== Civilian life ==
After the war ended, Bouck returned to St Louis and began duty as a recruiter. He was reintroduced to a fifth grade classmate, Lucille Zinzer, and began courting her. He was considering applying for a regular U.S. Army commission and West Point, when he applied for back pay for accumulated leave. The Army paid him for the leave at an enlisted man's pay rate, despite the fact that he'd been an officer while accruing the leave, and Bouck was furious. Bouck earned a high school equivalency diploma and married Lucille on April 27, 1946. Bouck then attended the Missouri Chiropractic College on the G.I. Bill and graduated in 1949. He practiced for nearly fifty years, until 1997. They had 5 children, Daniel, Diane, Denise, Douglas and Dwight. Two of his sons served as U.S. Navy pilots and the third followed his career as a chiropractor. He was a charter member of the Concord Village Lions Club and served as one of the early presidents.

His unit's actions were largely forgotten or unknown. Of his war experience, his wife Lucy said, "He never talked about it. Never." In 1965, the U.S. Army published a multi-volume history of World War II, The Ardennes: The Battle of the Bulge. Author Hugh M. Cole mentioned Bouck's platoon in passing, which upset platoon member William James (Tsakanikas). He contacted Bouck and encouraged his former commanding officer to get his men their proper recognition. Bouck contacted his former division commander, Maj. Gen. Walter E. Lauer, who nominated Bouck for a Silver Star. To Bouck's surprise, the Silver Star arrived in Bouck's mailbox in June 1966, but no other man was recognized, which upset Bouck. He was shortly afterwards interviewed by John S. D. Eisenhower for his book The Bitter Woods, in which the actions of the unit were told in detail. Eisenhower became the Ambassador to Belgium and hosted Bouck and other members of the platoon when they visited Lanzerath in December 1969.

Tsakanikas' war wounds troubled him for the rest of his life, and after his 37th operation, he died from complication on June 27, 1977. Columnist Jack Anderson unsuccessfully campaigned to see that William James (Tsakanikas) be awarded the Medal of Honor posthumously. Bouck died on December 2, 2016, from pneumonia.

== Unit recognition ==
On October 26, 1981, after considerable lobbying and letter-writing by Bouck, members of the unit were finally decorated. Fourteen of the 18 members were present at a special World War II Valor Awards ceremony at Ft. Myer, Virginia. Secretary of the Army John O. Marsh hosted the ceremony. Every member of the platoon was awarded the Presidential Unit Citation. Four members—Bouck, Slape, Milosevich, and Tsakanikas—were given the Distinguished Service Cross; five were given Silver Stars, and ten the Bronze Star with V devices, all for their 10-hour struggle with an entire 500-man-strong German battalion.

In 2004, the book The Longest Winter was published documenting the defensive actions of the platoon. Bouck cooperated with the author, Alex Kershaw, but imposed one condition, "I told him that other authors never wrote about the other men in the platoon, just me. I said I wouldn't talk to him unless he promised that he'd also write about the other men."
