= Alex Kershaw =

British journalist and writer

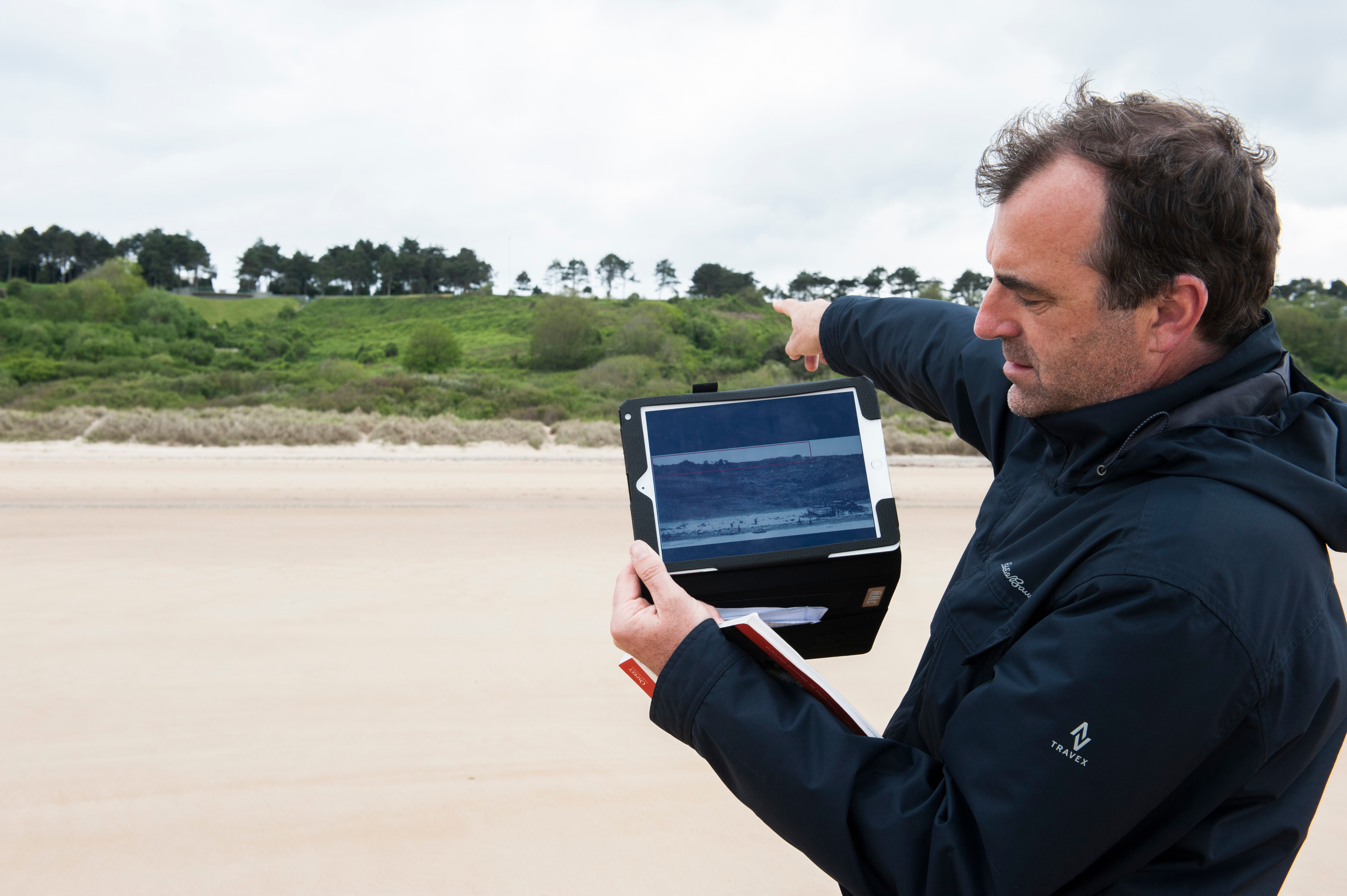
- Alex Kershaw at Omaha Beach, France
- Born: 1966 (age 59–60); York, England, United Kingdom
- Education: University College, Oxford
- Writing career
- Subject: World War II
- Notable works: The Bedford Boys; The Longest Winter; The Liberator: One World War II Soldier's 500-Day Odyssey from the Beaches of Sicily to the Gates of Dachau

Alex Kershaw (born 1966) is an English journalist, public speaker and the author of several best-selling books, including The Liberator, The First Wave, The Bedford Boys and The Longest Winter.

== Early life ==
Born in York, England, in 1966, Kershaw attended University College, Oxford where he studied politics, philosophy and economics. He taught history before working as a journalist for several British newspapers, including The Guardian, The Independent and The Sunday Times.

== Career ==
Kershaw's journalism has appeared in many magazines and newspapers since 1990, varying from investigative pieces and reportage to interviews with subjects ranging from Frank Zappa, Alger Hiss and Garry Kasparov to the boxer Max Schmeling and dozens of World War II veterans.

The Bedford Boys

While writing a 2002 biography, Blood and Champagne, about Robert Capa, the celebrated war photographer, Kershaw came across the story of Bedford, Virginia and its sacrifice on D-Day, 6 June 1944, on Dog Green sector of Omaha beach. The resulting book, The Bedford Boys, 2003, became a New York Times best-seller.

The Longest Winter, The Few, Escape from the Deep

Kershaw's next book, about the Battle of the Bulge, The Longest Winter, 2004, focused in particular on World War II's most decorated platoon, an I&R unit commanded by 20-year-old Lyle Bouck Jr. of the 99th Infantry Division. It was followed by other titles: The Few, 2006, the story of eight American pilots who fought illegally in the Battle of Britain; Escape from the Deep, 2008, the tale of the only successful escape from a submerged American submarine, the USS Tang, without surface assistance in late October 1944; and The Envoy, 2010, an account of Raoul Wallenberg's rescue efforts in Hungary during the Holocaust, based on extensive interviews with survivors saved by Wallenberg.

Television and film

Kershaw has also worked as a screenwriter and in television, penning an award-winning 2004 documentary for Arte on Bobby Kennedy. Several of his books have been optioned by Hollywood, including The Few which was selected as the Military Book Club's first-ever book of the year in 2006. Kershaw has appeared as a narrator in several documentaries, including the "Battle of the Bulge" episode of When Weather Changed History, "WWII IN 3D", the History Channel's "The Last Days of WWII", 2014's PBS Masters' 200th anniversary episode, "Salinger", and PBS's "D-Day 360".

The Liberator

His 2012 book, The Liberator: One World War II Soldier's 500-Day Odyssey from the Beaches of Sicily to the Gates of Dachau, tells the story of Texas-born Felix Sparks, an officer in the 157th Infantry Regiment of the 45th Infantry Division, who participated in four amphibious invasions in Europe and commanded the Thunderbird unit that liberated Dachau on 29 April 1945. It has been praised for its gritty realism and described by The Wall Street Journal as an "exceptional chronicle of one soldier's experience in WWII."

Netflix released The Liberator as a four hour series, penned by Jeb Stuart, in November 2020.

Avenue of Spies and The First Wave

Kershaw's Avenue of Spies, a New York Times best seller, published in August 2015, tells the story of the Avenue Foch in Paris in World War II, focusing in particular on Gestapo officer Helmut Knochen and an American doctor and his family. Kershaw's most recent book, The First Wave, a national best-seller, was published in 2019 to mark the 75th anniversary of D Day.

Lecturing and battlefield touring

Since 2012, Kershaw has led many battlefield tours of Europe. He has an honorary doctorate in military history from Norwich University and is a Board director of Friends of the National WWII Memorial. He also appears at conferences and events, in particular to commemorate the Second World War.

== Works ==
- Jack London: A Life St Martins Press, 1999. ISBN 978-0312181192 OCLC 0312181191
- Blood and Champagne: The Life and Times of Robert Capa. Macmillan, 2002. Thomas Dunne, 2003; ISBN 978-0312315641. Da Capo Press, 2004; ISBN 978-0306813566. Da Capo Press, 2006; ISBN 0-306-81356-4; OCLC 56133834.
- The Bedford Boys, Da Capo Press, 2003. ISBN 0-306-81167-7 OCLC 52133420
- The Longest Winter: The Battle of the Bulge and the Story of World War II's Most Decorated Platoon, Da Capo Press, 2004. ISBN 0-306-81304-1 OCLC 57045202
- The Few: The American "Knights of the Air" Who Risked Everything to Fight in the Battle of Britain, Cambridge, Massachusetts: Da Capo Press, 2006. ISBN 0-306-81303-3 OCLC 74284748
- Escape from the Deep: A Legendary Submarine and Her Courageous Crew, Perseus Books, 2008. ISBN 0-306-81519-2 OCLC 176894607
- The Envoy: The Epic Rescue of the Last Jews of Europe, Da Capo Press, 2010. ISBN 0-306-82043-9 OCLC 656544874
  - To Save a People, Hutchinson. UK edition
- The Liberator: One World War II Soldier's 500-Day Odyssey from the Beaches of Sicily to the Gates of Dachau, Crown Broadway, October 2012. ISBN 978-0-307-88799-3 OCLC 793503440
- Avenue of Spies: A True Story of Terror, Espionage, and One American Family's Heroic Resistance in Nazi-Occupied Paris, Crown, 2015. ISBN 978-0804140034 OCLC 910239494
- Kershaw, Alex, Richard Ernsberger, and Jennifer N. Pritzker. The General: William Levine, Citizen Soldier and Liberator. 2016. ISBN 0989792889 OCLC 960030901
- The First Wave: The D-Day Warriors Who Led the Way to Victory in World War II. Dutton, 2019. ISBN 9780451490056
