= 394th Infantry Regiment =

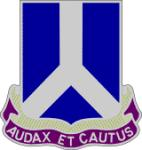
- 394th Infantry Regiment distinctive unit insignia
- Active: 1918; 1921–1945; 1999–present
- Country: USA
- Branch: United States Army Reserve
- Role: Training and support
- Mottos: Audax et Cautus (Bold and Wary)
- Engagements: World War II: Ardennes-Alsace; Central Europe

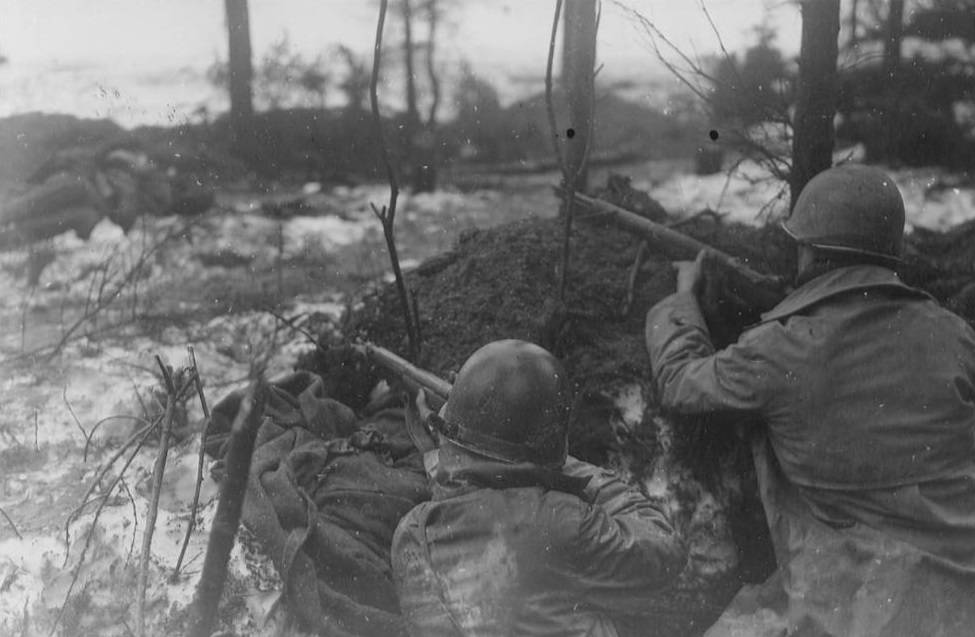
Soldiers of the I Company, 394th Infantry Regiment near Bad Honningen in March 1945, fighting to expand the bridgehead east of the Ludendorff Bridge on the Rhine.

The 394th Infantry Regiment was established on 23 July 1918 as the 394th Infantry and assigned to the 99th Division as a member of the National Army. It was demobilized on 30 November 1918, but was later reconstituted on 21 June 1921 as a member of the Organized Reserves just like the 99th Infantry Division. The regiment's headquarters was established at Pittsburgh, PA.

== History ==
The 394th Infantry was demobilized on 30 November 1918 as an inactive element of the 99th Division. It was reconstituted in the Organized Reserve on 24 June 1921, assigned to the 99th Division, and allotted to the Third Corps Area. It was initiated on 7 December 1921 with regimental headquarters at Pittsburgh, Pennsylvania. Subordinate battalion headquarters were concurrently organized as follows: 1st Battalion at Washington, Pennsylvania; 2nd Battalion at Uniontown, Pennsylvania; and 3rd Battalion at Chambersburg, Pennsylvania. The regimental headquarters was relocated on 11 December 1929 to Uniontown. The regiment conducted summer training most years with the 12th Infantry Regiment at Fort George G. Meade or Fort Howard, Maryland, and some years with the 34th Infantry Regiment at Fort Eustis, Virginia. Also conducted infantry Citizens Military Training Camps some years at Fort George G. Meade or Fort Howard as an alternate form of summer training. Typically conducted inactive training period meetings at the armory of the Pennsylvania National Guard's 176th Field Artillery Regiment in Pittsburgh and at the county auditorium in Uniontown. The primary ROTC feeder schools for new Reserve lieutenants for the regiment were Pennsylvania State College and Pennsylvania Military College.

During World War II the 394th Infantry Regiment was called to active duty on 15 November 1942 and reorganized at Camp Van Dorn, Mississippi. During 1943–1944, the 394th trained at various camps and maneuvers in the southern part of the US. The 394th arrived at Camp Myles Standish, Massachusetts, in mid-September and within two weeks the regiment made its way onto transport ships to England. Between mid-October and early November, the 394th was in Dorset, England before arriving on 6 November 1944 in Le Havre, France. The 394th engaged in a variety of campaigns, including the Battle of the Bulge and the Ardennes Forest, Remagen Bridge, the Rhineland, and the Ruhr. The 394th was inactivated on 29 September 1945 at Camp Patrick Henry, Va.

On 29 October 1998, the 394th Infantry Regiment was reactivated and renamed the 1st Battalion, 394th Regiment, and assigned to the 75th Division, a training support division in the United States Army Reserve.

== Intelligence and Reconnaissance Platoon ==
The 394th Infantry Regiment's Intelligence and Reconnaissance Platoon under the command of Lieutenant Lyle Bouck became the most decorated American unit of World War II due to the actions of the eighteen men of the platoon while fighting in the Battle of Lanzerath Ridge during the Battle of the Bulge. The platoon was recognized with Presidential Unit Citation Order No. 26 in 1981.

A memorial plaque is mounted on a stone at the N626 at the Losheimergraben crossroads. Four members (including Bouck) received the Distinguished Service Cross, five the Silver Star, and nine the Bronze Star with V device. Additionally, every member of a four-man artillery observation team which joined their defense received the Distinguished Service Cross.

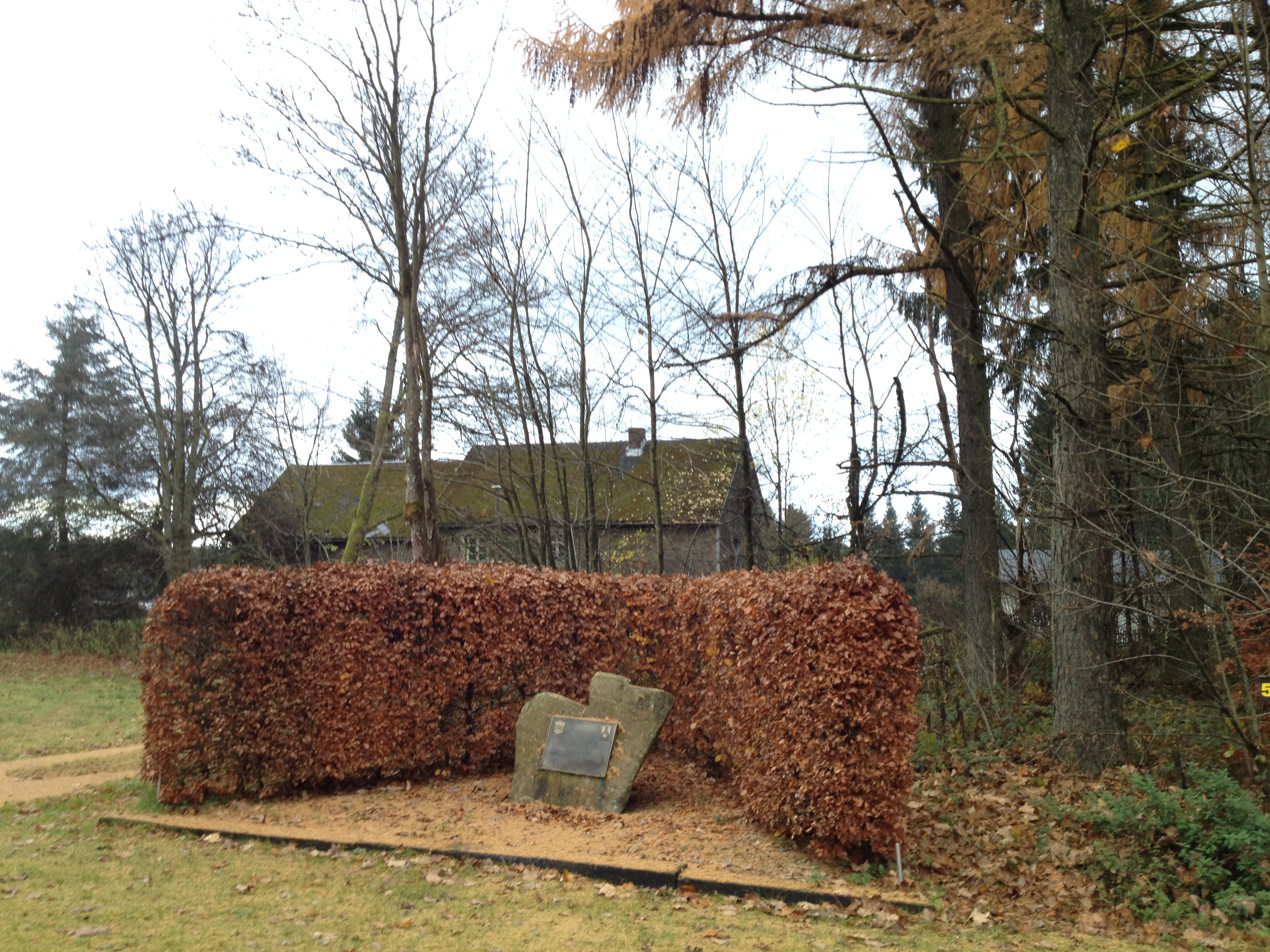
Memorial for the 394th's I&R platoon with the text of the unit's Presidential Unit Citation at Losheimergraben, Belgium.
