= 99th Readiness Division =

1918-1945 United States Army formation

99th Readiness Division 99th Infantry Division
- 99th Infantry Division shoulder sleeve insignia
- Active: 23 June 1918–November 1919 (National Army); 24 June 1921–27 September 1945 (Organized Reserves); 22 December 1967–15 April 1996 (99th ARCOM); 15 April 1996–16 July 2003 (99th RSC); 16 July 2003–17 September 2008 (99th RRC); 17 September 2008–2017 (99th RSC); 2017–present (99th Readiness Div.)
- Country: United States
- Branch: United States Army Reserve
- Type: Readiness
- Size: Division
- Part of: United States Army Reserve Command
- Garrison/HQ: Joint Base McGuire–Dix–Lakehurst, NJ
- Nicknames: "Battle Babies" "Checkerboard Division"
- Motto: “Checkmate”
- Engagements: World War II; Rhineland; Ardennes-Alsace; Central Europe
- Decorations: Belgian fourragère

Commanders
- Current commander: Maj. Gen. Laurence “Scott” Linton
- Command Sergeant Major: CSM Corey A. Thompson
- Notable commanders: Walter E. Lauer

Insignia
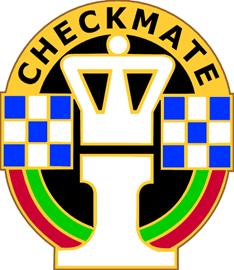
- Distinctive unit insignia

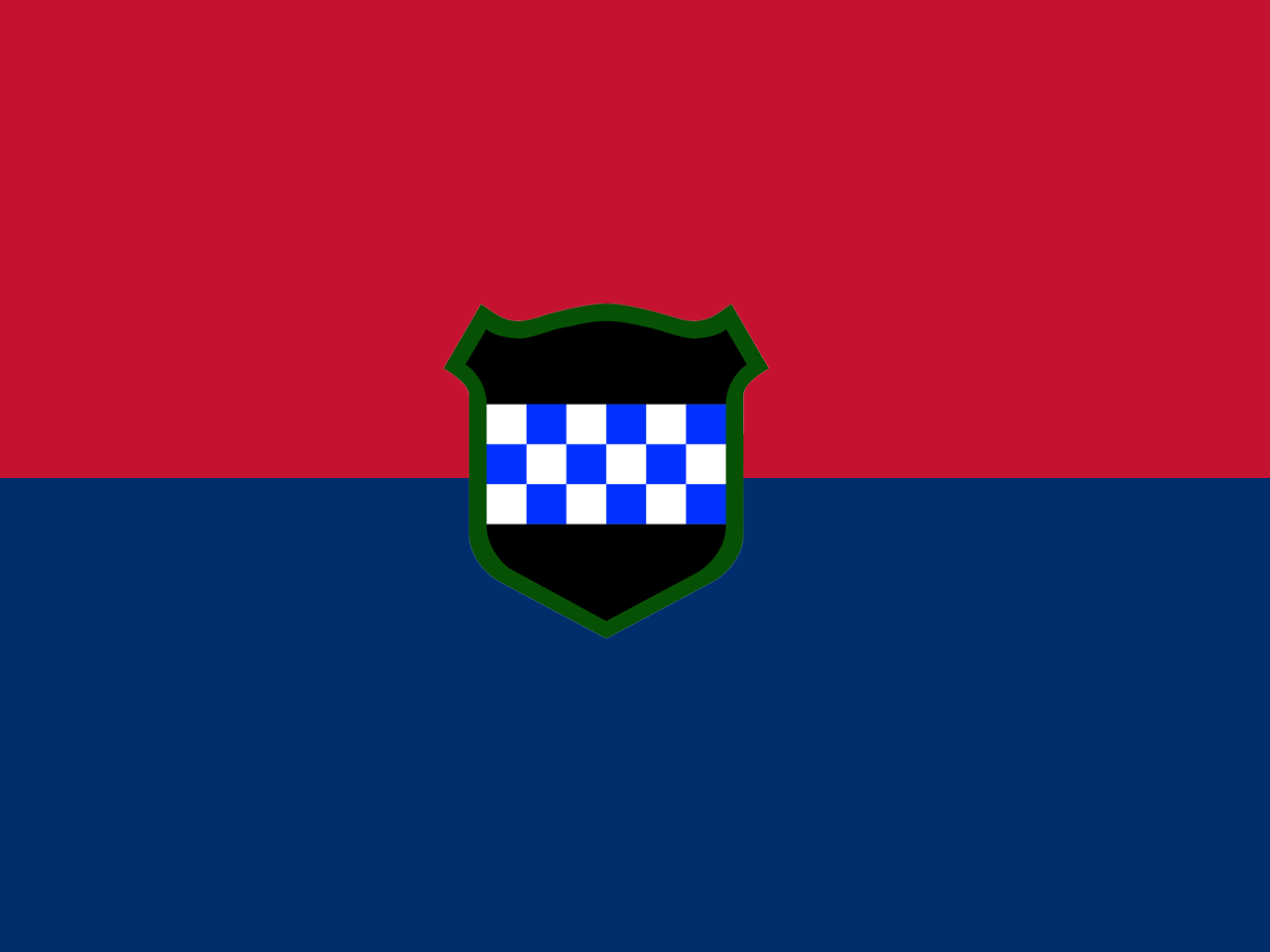
- Flag of the United States Army 99th Infantry Division

The 99th Infantry Division was an infantry division of the United States Army. It briefly existed, but never deployed, in the closing days of the First World War, was reconstituted in the Reserves in 1921, was ordered into active military service in 1942, and deployed overseas in 1944. The 99th landed at the French port of Le Havre and proceeded northeast to Belgium. During the heavy fighting in the Battle of the Bulge, the unit suffered many casualties, yet tenaciously held its defensive position. In March 1945, the 99th advanced into the Rhineland, crossing the Rhine River at Remagen on March 11. After fighting in the Ruhr area, the unit moved southward into Bavaria, where it was located at the end of the war.

The 99th Infantry Division gained the nickname the "Checkerboard" division, from its unit insignia that was devised in 1923 while it was headquartered in the city of Pittsburgh. The blue and white checkerboard in the insignia is taken from the coat of arms of William Pitt, for whom Pittsburgh is named. The division was also known as the "Battle Babies" during 1945, a sobriquet coined by a United Press correspondent when the division was first mentioned in press reports during the Battle of the Bulge.

On May 3–4, 1945, as the 99th moved deeper into Bavaria, it liberated one of a number of Dachau subcamps near the town of Mühldorf. The unit reported on May 4 that it had "liberated 3 labor camps and 1 concentration camp." The concentration camp was one of the "forest camps" (Waldlager) tied to the Mühldorf camp complex. The 99th Infantry's report stated that 1,500 Jews were "living under terrible conditions and approximately 600 required hospitalization due to starvation and disease."

The 99th Infantry Division was recognized as a liberating unit by the US Army's Center of Military History and the United States Holocaust Memorial Museum in 1992.

The insignia, though not the US Army recognized lineage, is maintained by the 99th Readiness Division, a United States Army Reserve (USAR) unit constituted in 1967, serving as of 2023 as a geographic command, headquartered at Fort Dix in New Jersey.

== History ==
=== World War I ===
On 23 July 1918, the War Department directed the organization of the 99th Division at Camp Wheeler, Georgia. Plans called for the division to include a headquarters, headquarters troop, the 197th Infantry Brigade (393rd and 394th Infantry Regiments and 371st Machine Gun Battalion), 198th Infantry Brigade (395th and 396th Infantry Regiments and 372nd Machine Gun Battalion), 370th Machine Gun Battalion, 174th Field Artillery Brigade (370th-372nd Field Artillery Regiments and 28th Trench Mortar Battery), 324th Engineers, 624th Field Signal Battalion, and 324th Train Headquarters and Military Police (Ammunition, Engineer, Sanitary, and Supply Trains). It was intended that the 197th Infantry Brigade would be organized in France from the 54th and 55th Pioneer Infantry Regiments.

The 28th Trench Mortar Battery was formed at Fort Sheridan, Illinois, in August 1918 and was assigned to the 174th Field Artillery Brigade, but never ended up joining. The organization of the division began in October with the appointment of Lieutenant Colonel Paul W. Beck as division chief of staff, but organization never progressed beyond the assignment of the division staff and preliminary preparations for the receipt of Selective Service men. After the Armistice of 11 November 1918, the 99th Division was ordered demobilized on 30 November 1918.

=== Interwar period ===
The 99th Division was demobilized on 7 January 1919 at Camp Wadsworth, South Carolina. It was reconstituted in the Organized Reserve on 24 June 1921, allotted to the Third Corps Area, and assigned to the XIII Corps. The division was further allotted to the western half of the state of Pennsylvania as its home area. The division headquarters was organized in November 1921 at 3939 Butler Street, in Pittsburgh. The headquarters was relocated in December 1922 to Room 604 in the Chamber of Commerce Building. It was relocated again in October 1923 to Room 310 in the Westinghouse Building and remained there until activated for World War II. After its reorganization, the division slowly built its strength, and by July 1924, the division was at 100 percent strength in authorized officers, but dropped back to 91 percent by March 1926. Typically, many of the division's units in Pittsburgh conducted their inactive training period meetings at the National Guard armory in that city. The division was chiefly composed of graduates from the ROTC programs of the Carnegie Institute of Technology, Duquesne University. Pennsylvania State College, and the Pennsylvania Military College as the number of ROTC officers in the Officers' Reserve Corps overtook the number of World War I-veteran officers beginning in 1929. During the interwar period, all units of the division except the 394th Infantry Regiment and 198th Infantry Brigade were headquartered in Pittsburgh. The command of all three Organized Reserve divisions in a given corps area nominally fell to the corps area commander, with the divisions' chiefs of staff responsible for day-to-day operations, but some corps area commanders designated a junior general officer in their corps area to serve as division commander; from 13 June 1929 to 23 August 1932, Brigadier General James B. Gowen, concurrently the commander of the 1st Division's 1st Field Artillery Brigade, commanded the 99th Division.

The designated mobilization and training station for the division was Camp George G. Meade (later redesignated Fort George G. Meade in 1929), Maryland, the location where much of the 99th's training activities occurred over the next 20 years. For the few summers when the division headquarters was called to duty for training as a unit, it usually trained with the staff of the 16th Infantry Brigade, 8th Division, at Camp Meade. The infantry regiments of the division held their summer training primarily with the units of the 16th Infantry Brigade at Fort Meade or Fort Eustis, Virginia. Other units, such as the special troops, artillery, engineers, aviation, medical, and quartermaster, trained at various posts in the Third Corps Area with Regular Army units of the same branch. For example, the 304th Engineer Regiment usually trained with elements of the 1st Engineer Regiment at Fort DuPont, Delaware; the 304th Medical Regiment trained with the 1st Medical Regiment at Carlisle Barracks, Pennsylvania; and the 324th Observation Squadron trained with the 21st and 50th Observation Squadrons at Langley Field, Virginia. In addition to the unit training camps, the infantry regiments rotated responsibility to conduct the Citizens Military Training Camps held at Camp Meade, Fort Eustis, and Fort Washington, Maryland, each year.

On a number of occasions, the division participated in Third Corps Area and First Army command post exercises (CPX) in conjunction with other Regular Army, National Guard, and Organized Reserve units. Two of the more notable CPXs were the Third Corps Area CPX at Fort George G. Meade conducted 6–19 July 1930 and a division CPX conducted 23 August–5 September 1936 at Indiantown Gap Military Reservation, Pennsylvania. Unlike the Regular and Guard units in the Third Corps Area, the 99th Division did not participate in the various Third Corps Area maneuvers and the First Army maneuvers of 1935 and 1939 as an organized unit due to lack of enlisted personnel and equipment. Instead, the officers and a few enlisted reservists were assigned to Regular and Guard units to fill vacant slots and bring the units up to full peace strength for the exercises.

=== World War II ===
- Ordered into active military service: 15 November 1942 Camp Van Dorn, Mississippi.
- Overseas: 30 September 1944
- Campaigns: Rhineland, Ardennes-Alsace, Central Europe
- Days of combat: 151
- Returned to U.S.: 17 September 1945
- Inactivated: 15 October 1945, Camp Patrick Henry, Virginia

==== Mobilization ====
Before Organized Reserve infantry divisions were ordered into active military service, they were reorganized on paper as "triangular" divisions under the 1940 tables of organization. The headquarters companies of the two infantry brigades were consolidated into the division's cavalry reconnaissance troop, and one infantry regiment was removed by inactivation. The field artillery brigade headquarters and headquarters battery became the headquarters and headquarters battery of the division artillery. Its three field artillery regiments were reorganized into four battalions; one battalion was taken from each of the two 75 mm gun regiments to form two 105 mm howitzer battalions, the brigade's ammunition train was reorganized as the third 105 mm howitzer battalion, and the 155 mm howitzer battalion was formed from the 155 mm howitzer regiment. The engineer, medical, and quartermaster regiments were reorganized into battalions. In 1942, divisional quartermaster battalions were split into ordnance light maintenance companies and quartermaster companies, and the division's headquarters and military police company, which had previously been a combined unit, was split.

==== Division organization ====
The division consisted of the following units:

99th Infantry Division organization (click to enlarge)

- 99th Infantry Division
  - 99th Infantry Division Headquarters
  - 99th Cavalry Reconnaissance Troop (Mechanized) (M3 scout cars and then M8 Greyhound armored cars)
  - 393rd Infantry Regiment
    - Headquarters and Headquarters Company
    - 3× Infantry battalions
      - each battalion consists of: 1× Headquarters and Headquarters Company, 3× Rifle companies, 1× Heavy Weapons Company
    - Cannon Company (T12 Gun Motor Carriages and T19 Howitzer Motor Carriages, later replaced by either M3 105mm towed howitzers or M7 Priest self propelled howitzers)
    - Anti-Tank Company (M3 37mm anti-tank guns, which were replaced by 1944 with M1 57mm anti-tank guns)
    - Service Company
  - 394th Infantry Regiment
    - same organization as 393rd Infantry Regiment
  - 395th Infantry Regiment
    - same organization as 393rd Infantry Regiment
  - 99th Infantry Division Artillery
    - Headquarters and Headquarters Battery
    - 370th Field Artillery Battalion
      - Headquarters and Headquarters Battery
      - 3× Batteries (M2 105mm towed howitzers)
      - Service Battery
    - 371st Field Artillery Battalion
      - same organization as 370th Field Artillery Battalion
    - 372nd Field Artillery Battalion
      - Headquarters and Headquarters Battery
      - 3× Batteries (M1 155mm towed howitzers)
      - Service Battery
    - 924th Field Artillery Battalion
      - same organization as 370th Field Artillery Battalion
  - Headquarters Special Troops
    - Headquarters Company, 99th Infantry Division
    - 99th Signal Company
    - 99th Quartermaster Company
    - 799th Ordnance Light Maintenance Company
    - Military Police Platoon
    - 99th Infantry Division Band (attached)
  - 324th Engineer Combat Battalion
    - Headquarters and Headquarters and Service Company
    - 3× Engineer combat companies
  - 324th Medical Battalion
    - Headquarters and Headquarters Detachment
    - 3× Collecting companies
    - Clearing Company

Many members of the 99th Infantry Division had participated in the Army Specialized Training Program or ASTP, derisively nicknamed "all safe 'till peace;" in February 1944, the program was drawn down, and the majority of its members were assigned to later-deploying divisions such as the 99th.

==== Combat chronicle ====
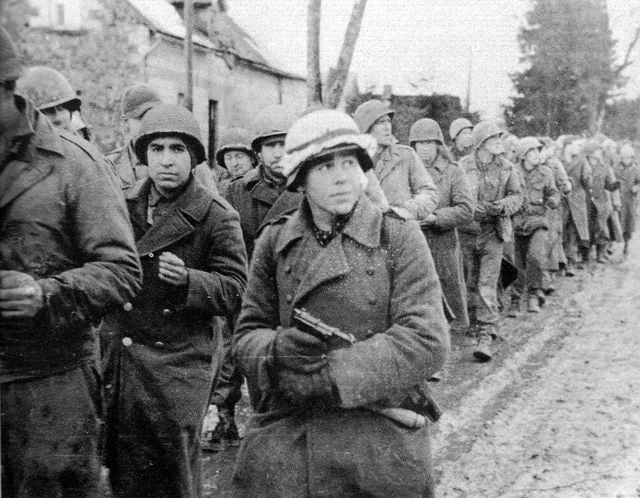
17 December 1944 US POWS 99th Infantry Division taken prisoner in Honsfeld Belgium by the German 3rd Parachute Division marched through Hasenvenn. Sergeant Luther Symons (on the left)

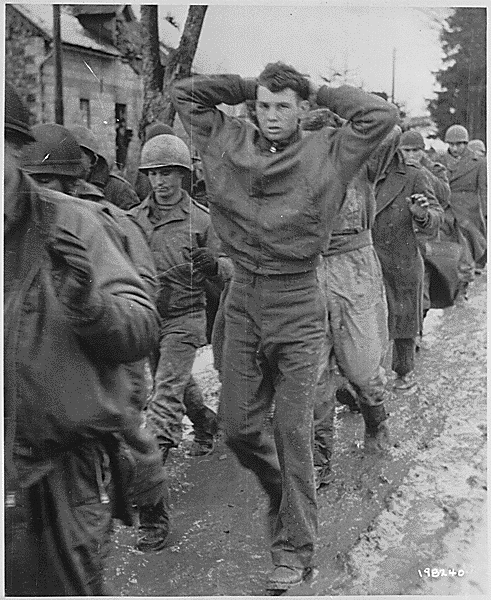
99th Division POWS 18 December 1944 Lanzerath, Liege, Belgium

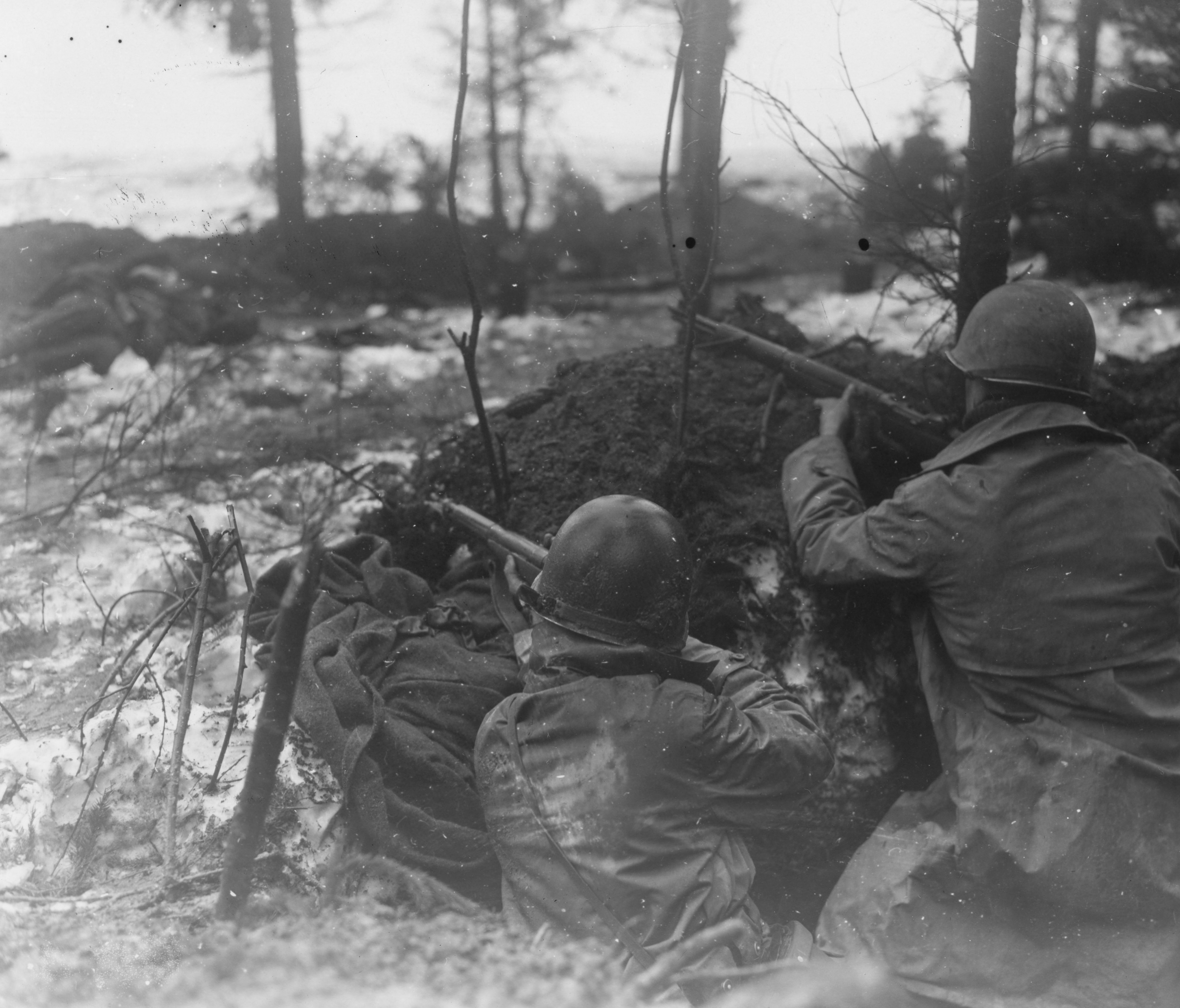
99th Division riflemen man a foxhole near Rocherath, Belgium. 1 February 1945.

The 99th Infantry Division, comprising the 393rd, 394th, and the 395th Infantry Regiments, arrived in England on 10 October 1944. Put under the operational control of V Corps, First Army, it moved to Le Havre, France on 3 November and proceeded to Aubel, Belgium, to prepare to enter the front lines.

The division first saw action on 9 November, taking over the defense of the sector north of the Roer River between Schmidt and Monschau, a distance of nearly 19 miles. After defensive patrolling, the 99th probed the Siegfried Line against heavy resistance on 13 December. Formerly nicknamed the "Checkerboard Division," which referred to its shoulder patch, in late 1944 having not yet seen battle, the division was nicknamed the "Battle Babies."

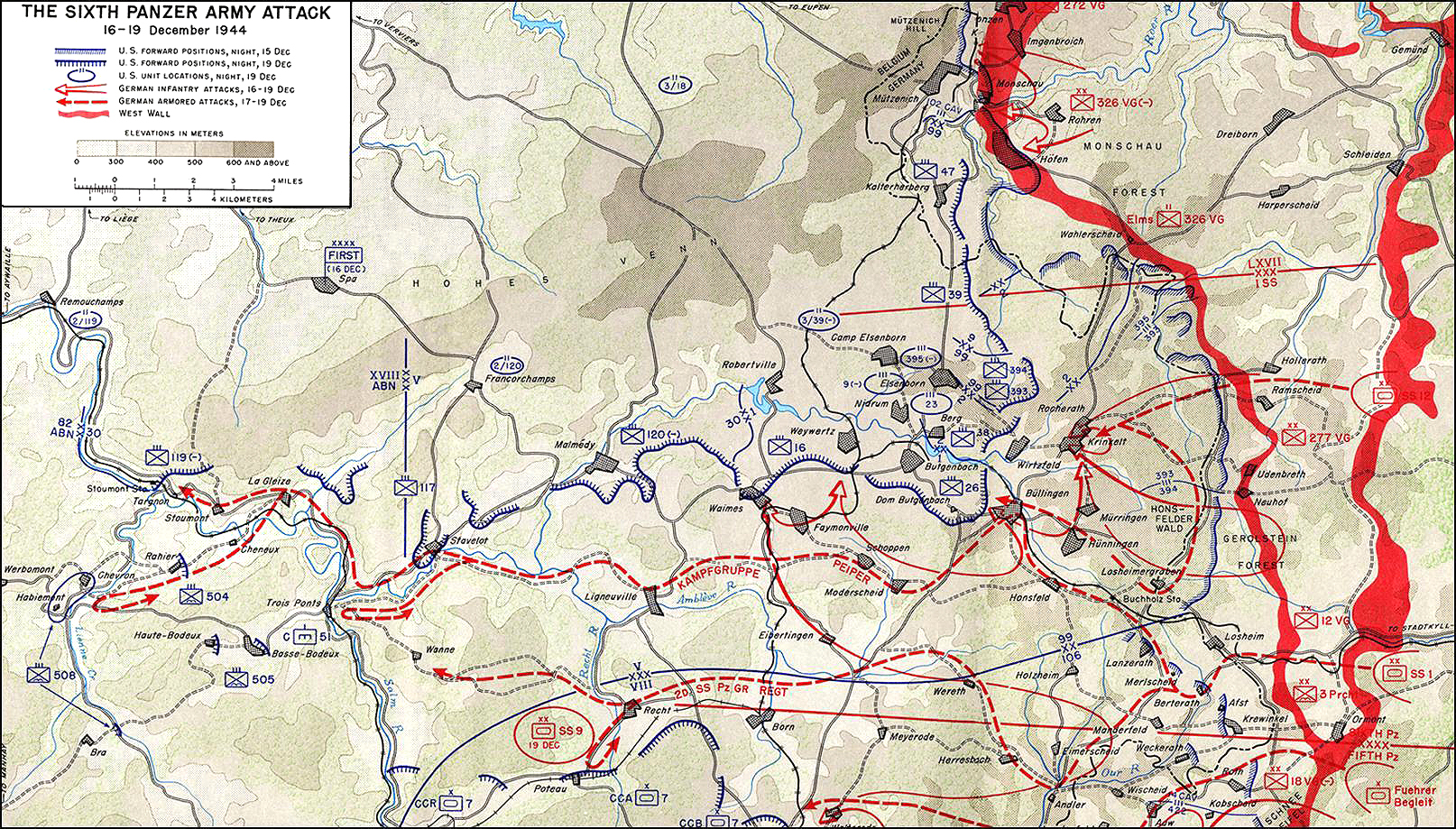
Map depicting the northern shoulder of the Battle of the Bulge, or Ardennes Offensive, in which the German Sixth Panzer Army attacked the United States' 99th Infantry Division, but could not dislodge them. The 99th Division's effective defense of the sector prevented the Germans from accessing the valuable road network and considerably slowed their timetable, allowing the Allies to bring up additional reinforcements.

The inexperienced troops of the division were lodged on the northern shoulder of the Ardennes Offensive on 16 December, unexpectedly facing the advancing German 6th Panzer Army.

The 99th Infantry Division lost about 20% of its effective strength, including 465 killed and 2,524 evacuated due to wounds, injuries, fatigue, or trench foot. In addition, 1,136 men of the 99th became prisoners of war, the majority of them were captured in the Ardennes Offensive. Historian John S.D. Eisenhower wrote, "... the action of the 2nd and 99th Divisions on the northern shoulder could be considered the most decisive of the Ardennes campaign."

At Höfen, a town at the northern edge of the Sixth Panzer Army's offensive that connected to the crucial Monschau–Eupen–Liège road network, 3rd Battalion, 395th Infantry Regiment, reinforced by Company A, 612th Tank Destroyer Battalion, repeatedly defeated armored and infantry attacks by the 326th Volksgrenadier Division. Although units at this sector were at times virtually surrounded, it did not yield ground. On at least six occasions 3rd Battalion called in artillery on or close to their own positions. Casualties for the Germans in this sector were heavy and disproportionate. Outnumbered 5 to 1, the American defenders inflicted casualties of 18 to 1. 3rd Battalion, 395th Infantry Regiment and Company A, 612th Tank Destroyer Battalion were awarded the Presidential Unit Citation for the defense of Höfen.

The stiff American defense prevented the Germans from reaching the vast array of supplies near the Belgian cities of Liège and Spa and the road network west of the Elsenborn Ridge leading to the Meuse River. After more than ten days of intense battle, they pushed the Americans out of the villages, but were unable to dislodge them from the ridge, where elements of the V Corps of the First U.S. Army prevented the German forces from reaching the road network to their west.

Although cut up and surrounded in part, the 99th was one of the only divisions that did not yield to the German attack, and held their positions until reinforcements arrived. The lines were then moved back to form defensive positions east of Elsenborn Ridge on the 19th. Here it held firmly against violent enemy attacks. From 21 December 1944 to 30 January 1945, the unit was engaged in aggressive patrolling and reequipping. It attacked toward the Monschau Forest, on 1 February, mopping up and patrolling until it was relieved for training and rehabilitation, on 13 February.

The Intelligence and Reconnaissance Platoon, 394th Infantry Regiment, 99th Division was the most decorated platoon for a single action of World War II. During the first morning of the Battle of the Bulge, they defended a key road junction in the vicinity of the Losheim Gap. Led by 20-year-old Lieutenant Lyle Bouck Jr., they delayed the advance of the 1st SS Panzer Division, the spearhead of the entire German 6th Panzer Army, for nearly 20 hours. In a long fight with about 500 men of the 1st Battalion, 9th Fallschirmjaeger Regiment, 3rd Fallschirmjaeger Division, the 18 men of the platoon along with four artillery observers inflicted between 60 and more than 100 casualties on the Germans. The platoon seriously disrupted the entire German Sixth Panzer Army's schedule of attack along the northern edge of the offensive. At dusk on 16 December, after virtually no sleep during the preceding night and a full day of almost non-stop combat, with only a few rounds of ammunition remaining, about 50 German paratroopers finally flanked and captured the remaining 19 soldiers. Two men who had been sent on foot to regimental headquarters to seek reinforcements were later captured. Fourteen of the 18 platoon members were wounded, while only one soldier, a member of the artillery observation team, was killed.

Because the unit's radios had been destroyed, the soldiers captured, and the rapid subsequent German advance, U.S. Army commanders did not know about the unit's success at slowing the German advance, or even if they had been captured or killed. The platoon members were not recognized for their courageous deeds for thirty-seven years. On 25 October 1981, the entire platoon was recognized with a Presidential Unit Citation. Every member of the platoon was decorated, which included four Distinguished Service Crosses, five Silver Stars and ten Bronze Stars with "V" devices signifying awards for valor in combat.

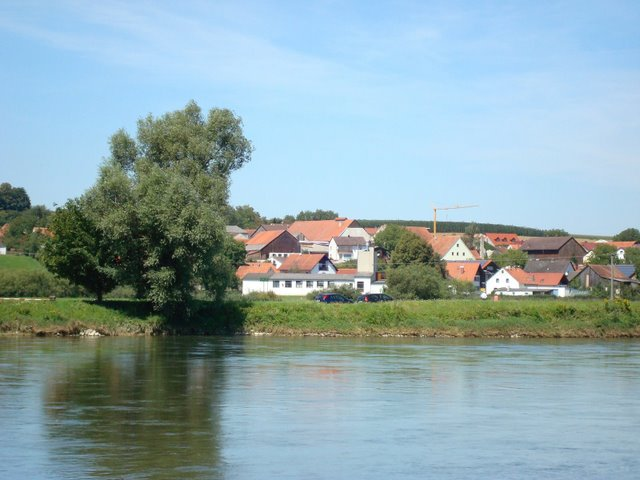
Danube river near Eining, Germany

On 2 March 1945, the division took the offensive, moving toward Cologne and crossing the Erft Canal near Glesch. After clearing towns west of the Rhine, it crossed the Ludendorff Bridge at Remagen on the 11th. The 99th Infantry Division was the first complete division to cross the Rhine. They continued to Linz am Rhein and to the Wied River. Crossing on the 23d, it pushed east on the Koln-Frankfurt highway to Giessen. Against light resistance, it crossed the Dill River and pushed on to Krofdorf-Gleiberg, taking Giessen 29 March. The 99th then moved to Schwarzenau, on 3 April, and attacked the southeast sector of the Ruhr Pocket on the 5th. Although the enemy resisted fiercely, the Ruhr pocket collapsed with the fall of Iserlohn, on 16 April.

The last drive began on 23 April. The 99th crossed the Ludwig Canal against stiff resistance and established a bridgehead over the Altmuhl River, 25 April. The division crossed the Danube near Eining on the 27th and after a stubborn fight the Isar at Landshut on 1 May. On 3–4 May, the division liberated two labor camps and a "forest camp" (Waldlager) related to the Mühldorf concentration camp, a sub-camp of Dachau. The 99th Infantry's after action report stated they found 1,500 Jews "living under terrible conditions and approximately 600 required hospitalization due to starvation and disease." The division continued to attack without opposition to the Inn River and Giesenhausen until VE-day.

==== Casualties ====
- Total battle casualties: 6,553
- Killed in action: 993
- Wounded in action: 4,177
- Missing in action: 247
- Prisoner of war: 1,136

==== Assignments in ETO ====
- 4 November 1944: V Corps, First United States Army, 12th Army Group
- 18 December 1944: Attached to 2nd Infantry Division of the V Corps, First Army, 12th Army Group
- 20 December 1944: Attached, with the entire First Army, to the British 21st Army Group
- 7 January 1945: Relieved from attachment to the 2nd Infantry Division and assigned to V Corps, First Army (attached to the British 21st Army Group), 12th Army Group
- 18 January 1945: V Corps, First Army, 12th Army Group
- 20 February 1945: VII Corps
- 9 March 1945: III Corps
- 19 April 1945: III Corps, Third Army, 12th Army Group

==== Individual awards ====
- Distinguished Unit Citations: 2
- Distinguished Service Cross (United States)- 16
- Distinguished Service Medal (U.S. Army)-1
- Silver Star- 252
- Legion of Merit- 6
- DFC- 7
- Soldier's Medal-8
- Bronze Star – 2,127
- Air Medal- 48
- Medal of Honor-1

The Medal of Honor was awarded T/Sgt Vernon McGarity, Company L, 393rd Infantry, 99th Infantry Division, for actions taken near Krinkelt, Belgium, on 16 December 1944 during the opening phases of the Battle of the Bulge (a.k.a. the Ardennes Offensive).

When the Battle of the Bulge ended, Gen. Lauer received verbal commendations from Field Marshal Sir Bernard L. Montgomery, 21st Army Group Commander, and Gen. Courtney Hodges, First Army Commander, on the vigorous and effective defense contributed by the 99th.

A written commendation was received from Maj. Gen. Leonard T. Gerow, V Corps Commander:

I wish to express to you and the members of your command my appreciation and commendation for the fine job you did in preventing the enemy from carrying out his plans to break through the V Corps sector and push on to the Meuse River. Not only did your command assist in effectively frustrating that particular part of the plan, but it also inflicted such heavy losses on the enemy that he was unable to carry out other contemplated missions in other sectors of the Allied front.
Gen. von Manteuffel, commander of the 5th Panzer Army, stated in the address to his troops prior to the attack that "our ground mission must be continuous; otherwise we will not achieve our goal". Due in part to the 99th Infantry Division, this ground mission has not been continuous, and he will not achieve his goal...

==== Commanders ====
- Maj. Gen. Thompson Lawrence (November 1942 – July 1943)
- Maj. Gen. Walter E. Lauer (July 1943 – 18 August 1945)
- Brig. Gen. Frederick H. Black (August 1945 to inactivation)

=== Recent history ===
On 22 December 1967, the 99th Army Reserve Command (ARCOM) was activated. While the 99th ARCOM was allowed to wear the shoulder sleeve insignia of the 99th Infantry Division and use its number, Department of the Army policy does not allow for the lineage of MTOE units, such as infantry divisions, to be perpetuated by TDA units, such as ARCOMs. In 1975, the 99th ARCOM moved its headquarters to Oakdale, Pennsylvania.

After Iraq invaded Kuwait in August 1990, 22 99th units deployed to Saudi Arabia, Europe, and other locations. After the Gulf War, the 99th ARCOM became the 99th Regional Support Command (RSC). The 99th RSC's mission was to provide command and control and full-service support for assigned units and facility management.

On 23 Dec. 1996, the 99th RSC mobilized the first of six units for deployment to Operation Joint Endeavor in support of peacekeeping missions in Bosnia. The 99th RSC continued to support operations in the Balkan Republics while providing refuge to those fleeing Kosovo as they sought temporary recovery in the United States.

Following the 11 September 2001, terrorist attacks, the 99th mobilized large numbers of Army Reserve Soldiers. While the 99th was fully involved in this large mobilization, the headquarters moved to Coraopolis, Pennsylvania. In January 2003, the 99th RSC started mobilizing units for projected operations in Iraq.

On 16 July 2003, the command was redesignated as the 99th Regional Readiness Command, placing additional emphasis on training, readiness, and mobilization. The 99th RRC continued to provide command and control for assigned units and support for the ongoing deployments.

In 2005, the Army Reserve began its latest transformation under the Base Realignment and Closure (BRAC) directive and lessons learned from eight years of deployments in support of the global war on terrorism. The 10 geographically based RRCs, including the 99th, were inactivated and replaced with four regional base operations commands. The 99th was selected as one of these new regional support commands.

In September 2007, in preparation for the transition to Fort Dix and establishment of the new 99th RSC, the 99th RRC assumed administrative responsibility for the former regions of the 77th and 94th RRCs, which had inactivated. On 17 September 2008, the 99th Regional Support Command was activated at Fort Dix, N.J. The 99th RSC's mission was to provide base operations functions for the assigned 13-state Northeast Region.

The 99th RSC was awarded the Army Superior Unit Award on 9 May 2016 by the US Army Human Resources Command for its role in the relief support after Hurricane Sandy, from 29 October 2012 thru 31 March 2013. Soldiers who were in direct support of the relief efforts were also awarded the Humanitarian Service Medal as a personal award.

== Units in 2025 ==
The 99th Readiness Division is a subordinate geographic command of the United States Army Reserve Command. The division provides programs and services that enhance individual and unit readiness for mobilization and deployment of Army Reserve forces in the states of Connecticut, Delaware, Maine, Maryland, Massachusetts, New Hampshire, New Jersey, New York, Pennsylvania, Rhode Island, Vermont, Virginia, and West Virginia. As of December 2025 the division consists of the following units:

- Headquarters and Headquarters Company, 99th Readiness Division, at Joint Base McGuire–Dix–Lakehurst (NJ)

Public Affairs units:
- 361st Theater Public Affairs Sustainment Element, at Fort Totten (NY)
  - 214th Mobile Public Affairs Detachment, in Richmond (VA)
  - 326th Mobile Public Affairs Detachment, in Reading (PA)
  - 354th Mobile Public Affairs Detachment, in Coraopolis (PA)
  - 356th Broadcast Operations Detachment, at Fort Meade (MD)
  - 362nd Mobile Public Affairs Detachment, in Londonderry (NH)

Military History Detachments:
- 21st Military History Detachment, at Fort Detrick (MD)
- 27th Military History Detachment, at Fort Detrick (MD)
- 52nd Military History Detachment, at Fort Indiantown Gap (PA)
- 53rd Military History Detachment, at Fort Detrick (MD)
- 201st Military History Detachment, in Coraopolis (PA)
- 305th Military History Detachment, in Coraopolis (PA)
- 311th Military History Detachment, at Joint Base McGuire–Dix–Lakehurst (NJ)
- 315th Military History Detachment, at Fort Indiantown Gap (PA)
- 326th Military History Detachment, in Coraopolis (PA)

Chaplain Detachments:
- 129th Chaplain Detachment, at Fort Drum (NY)
- 130th Chaplain Detachment, at Fort Lee (VA)
- 133rd Chaplain Detachment, in Coraopolis (PA)

This article contains content in the public domain from U.S. military sources.

== Division insignia ==
The unit's distinctive shoulder patch consisted of a five-sided shield of black on which is superimposed a horizontal band of white and blue squares. The black represents the iron from the mills of Pittsburgh, Pennsylvania where many of the troops were from. The blue and white are taken from the coat of arms for William Pitt for whom Pittsburgh was named. There are nine white squares and nine blue ones, signifying the number 99.

== Notable personnel ==
- Charles P. Roland
- Hoyt Wilhelm
