= Battle of Losheim Gap =

Part of the Battle of the Bulge of WWII

Losheim Gap
- Part of the Battle of the Bulge during World War II
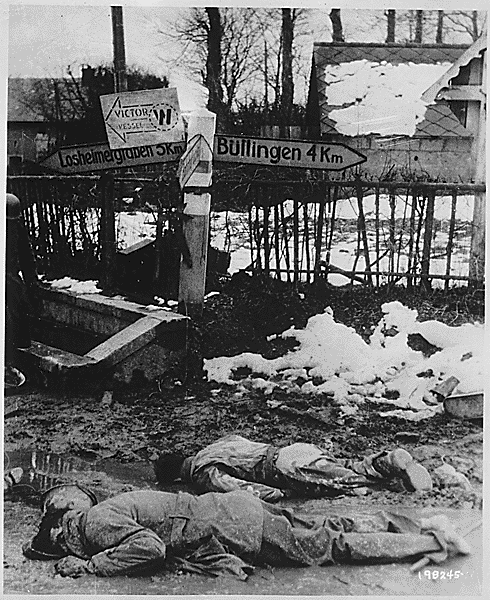
- American dead at a crossroads in Honsfeld, Belgium, at the northern end of the Losheim Gap
Date	16–17 December 1944
Location	Büllingen, Belgium 50°24′17″N 6°16′05″E
Result	German victory

Belligerents
United States	Germany

Commanders and leaders
Omar Bradley; Alan W. Jones	(Germany) Sepp Dietrich

Strength
106th Infantry Division (elements of) 99th Infantry Division (elements of) 14th Cavalry Group; Total strength: over 6,000 men, 30 light tanks, 18 medium tanks	1st SS Panzer Division; Total strength: ~17,000 men, 120+ Panzers and SPGs

Casualties and losses
3,750 casualties 450 killed, 1,000+ wounded, 2,300 captured 32 tanks	500 casualties 200 killed, 300 wounded 10 armored vehicles

The Battle of Losheim Gap was fought in the Ardennes, in Eastern Belgium, between the Allies and Nazi Germany, part of the Battle of the Bulge. It was the first battle and spearhead of the German attack and inflicted disorder on the American front lines, paving the way for further German attacks deeper into the Ardennes. While both sides suffered high casualties, the German losses were comparatively irreplaceable as all reserves had been directed to the counteroffensive. This reflected the poor state of the German Army at the time, which would be the precedent for the following battles.

== Background ==
Near the end of 1944, Nazi Germany was in a dire state. Germany proper was fighting a two-front war against giants it could no longer match: the American and British armies in the West, and the Soviet army in the East.

To counter the Western allies, Hitler planned a last-ditch Blitzkrieg through the Ardennes, a heavily forested region of eastern Belgium. He wanted to smash through the thinly defended Allied lines, move his tanks into the open Belgian countryside, and capture Antwerp, the main Allied supply port. This would divide the British and American forces and perhaps cause an evacuation of those forces from the Continent in a manner reminiscent of that from Dunkirk in 1940. Hitler could then agree to a ceasefire.

However, when Hitler told his generals of his plan in September 1944, they were astounded by its unrealism. From the start, the German High Command was not optimistic, as the plan exemplified Hitler's increasingly desperate and delusional state as the end of the war neared. They proposed a smaller offensive, but Hitler went through with his plan and launched the Ardennes offensive. Many generals sided with Hitler simply because, by this stage of the war, "defeatism" (merely admitting that the war would end in defeat) could lead to an officer's dismissal from service or worse.

== Plan of action ==
Led by the 1st SS Panzer division, they planned to attack the 2nd and 99th Infantry Divisions with the goal of capturing Losheimergraben and gaining access to the vital road network to its north and west that would allow them to capture the important port of Antwerp.

In a calculated risk, the Allies had only a few troops stretched very thinly across a wide area. Lanzerath, a village of about 15 homes, lay about 5 kilometres (3.1 mi) to the west of Losheim. It was on the border between U.S. VIII Corps to the south and U.S. V Corps. It was held by a single Intelligence and Reconnaissance Platoon of 18 men and Task Force X, a tank destroyer platoon of 55 men.

The German forces were located on the eastern edge of the Losheim Gap in Losheim and further east. The Siegfried Line between them divided the Losheim Gap.

SS Oberstgruppenführer Sepp Dietrich’s plan was for the 6th SS Panzer Army to advance northwest through Lanzerath and Bucholz Station and then drive through Honsfield and Büllingen. The infantry would continue north through Losheimergraben to push the 2nd and 99th Divisions out of the way. This would allow the 12th SS Panzer Division to advance westward towards a group of villages named Trois-Ponts, connect to Belgian Route Nationale N-23, and cross the river Meuse. It was then another 53 miles (85 km) to Antwerp.

== The battle ==
During the Battle of the Bulge, some of the best German units, including the 3rd Fallschirmjaeger Division and 6th Panzer Army planned to assault northwest over the Losheim-Losheimergraben road and along the railroad tracks through the Losheim Gap towards the village of Büllingen, but were held up by the broken railroad overpasses which they destroyed in their prior retreat. These were to be rebuilt on the first day of the offensive. Unable to quickly repair them, the units advanced instead into Lanzerath. In the day-long Battle of Lanzerath Ridge, they took dozens of casualties and were held up by the 18 remaining US troops that dug into a ridge overlooking the village, the 6th Panzer Army's advance was delayed.

On December 17, German engineers repaired one of the road bridges over the railroad along the Losheim-Losheimergraben road and the armor of the German SS 12th Division began advancing towards the key road junction at Losheimergraben.

Once past Lanzerath, the Germans planned to capture the road network. This plan was thwarted by the mostly inexperienced U.S. troops, who severely limited the German's advance, halting them at the Battle of Elsenborn Ridge. The Germans were forced to reroute their armor and troops to the south, over mostly single-lane country roads, severely limiting the speed of their advance and their ability to concentrate their strength on the limited American defenses.

In the south of the main German front, the 5th Panzer Army was given the task of capturing St. Vith and the vital road and rail network. The 18th Volksgrenadier Division under the command of Generalmajor Günther Hoffmann-Schönborn patrolled the Schnee Eifel area. On December 16 at 4:00 a.m., they took the twenty-two foot macadam road following the Our River valley towards Manderfield. The route terminated at several vital crossroads in the city of St. Vith. The 5th Panzer Army planned to bypass St. Vith to the north.

== Advance delayed ==
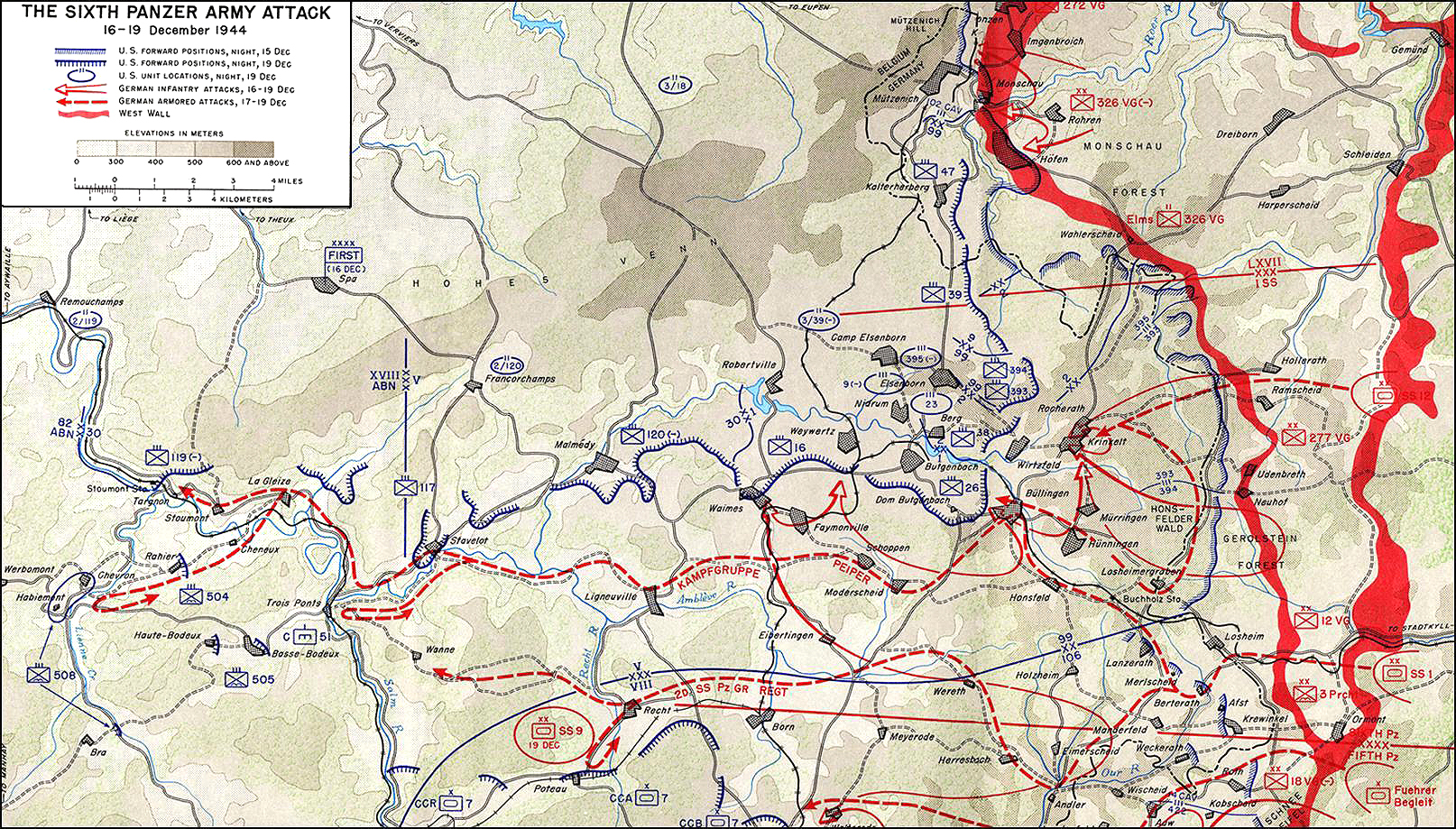
The northern shoulder of the Battle of the Bulge, in which Bouck's unit held up the German advance through a key intersection near Lanzerath for nearly a full day.

On the German side of the Siegfried Line, the Germans positioned their troops and armor around and to the east of the village of Losheim. On December 16, 1944, at 05:30, the Germans launched a 90-minute artillery barrage using 1,600 artillery pieces across an 80 miles (130 km) front.

The infantry of the 9th Fallschirmjaeger Regiment, 3rd Fallschirmjaeger Division led the way through the Losheim Gap, tasked with clearing American resistance along the main line of resistance. To spare the armor, they operated in advance of Kampfgruppe SS Standartenführer Joachim Peiper's 1st SS Panzer Division, the spearhead of Dietrich’s 6th Panzer Army. The infantry would then secure the right flank of the attack route near Losheimergraben.

The 12th Volksgrenadier Division reached Losheimgraben at 07:00 East of Losheim, Kampfgruppe Peiper expected to reach Losheimgraben by 08:00, but the tanks were held up for most of the morning of December 16 on the Blankenheim-Schnied road which was congested with horse-drawn artillery, infantrymen, and numerous other vehicles. Peiper himself tried to sort out the mess at one crossroads. For unknown reasons German engineers did not begin repairing the first of the railroad overpasses on the Losheim-Losheimergraben road until nearly noon, and the second was not repaired until December 17.

When Peiper got word that the overpass would not be repaired in time for his advance, he chose to move west through Lanzerath. He was frustrated and angry that the 9th Fallschirmjaeger Regiment had yet to report that the road was clear. The 500 troops of the 1st Battalion, 9th Fallschirmjaeger Regiment, 3rd Fallschirmjaeger Division were held up for most of the day by 18 men of the Intelligence and Reconnaissance Platoon, 394th Infantry Regiment, 99th Infantry Division at Lanzerath Ridge. At 18:00, Peiper finally learned that the village had been secured. His column of 117 tanks, 149 half-tracks, 18 105 mm guns and six 150 mm guns, totaling 600 vehicles, finally moved forward. He was further held up when his tanks struck two of their own minefields, slowing progress while the engineers cleared the fields ahead of mines.

Peiper finally arrived in Lanzerath near midnight only to find the infantry bedding down for the night. Every officer he spoke to said the woods were full of Americans and tanks. He furiously interrogated the infantry officers to learn if any patrols into the woods had been conducted and learned that no one had personally reconnoitered the area. Disgusted, Peiper demanded that Oberst Helmut von Hoffman, commander of the 9th Parachute Regiment, give him a battalion of paratroops to accompany his tanks. At 04:30 on December 17, more than 16 hours behind schedule, the 1st SS Panzer Division rolled out of Lanzerath with a battalion of paratroopers preceding them and headed east for Bucholz Station.

== Advance towards Hünningen ==
At Bucholz Station, the 3rd Battalion of the U.S. 394th Infantry Regiment was surprised and quickly captured, except for a headquarters company radio operator. Hidden in a cellar, he called in reports to division headquarters until he was finally captured. Driving west-northwest, the Germans entered Honsfeld, where they encountered one of the 99th Division's rest centers, clogged with confused American troops. They killed many and destroyed a number of American armored units and vehicles. Peiper easily captured the town and 50000 gallons of fuel for his vehicles. He then advanced towards Büllingen, keeping to the plan to move west, apparently unaware he had nearly taken the town and unknowingly bypassing an opportunity to flank and trap the entire 2nd and 99th Division. Peiper suddenly turned south to detour around Hünningen, interested only in getting back onto his assigned Rollbahn. Kampfgruppe Peiper a few days later gained notoriety for their murder of U.S. prisoners of war in what became known as the Malmedy massacre.

== Losheimergraben attack ==
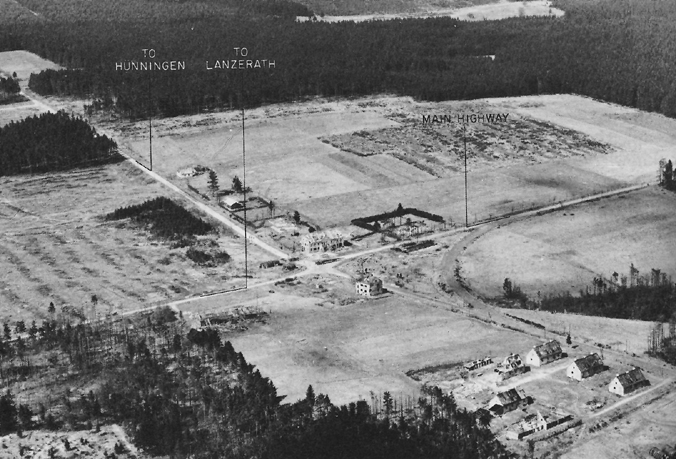
Losheimergraben Germany

The task of defeating the 99th Division was the objective of 12th SS Panzer Division reinforced by additional Panzergrenadier and Volksgrenadier divisions. On December 17, German engineers repaired one of the road bridges over the railroad along the Losheim-Losheimergraben road and the 12th Division German armor began advancing towards the key road junction at Losheimergraben and the twin villages of Rocherath and Krinkelt. However, in more than ten days of intense battle, they were unable to dislodge the Americans from Elsenborn Ridge, where elements of the V Corps of the First U.S. Army prevented the German forces from reaching the road network to their west.

The German advance never recovered from its initial delay, and the Sixth Panzer Army only got as far as La Gleize before its advance stalled out, advancing less than half-way to the River Meuse. The remaining soldiers were left to find their own way back to the east.
