= George Hairston Jamerson =

United States Army general (1869–1960)

George H. Jamerson
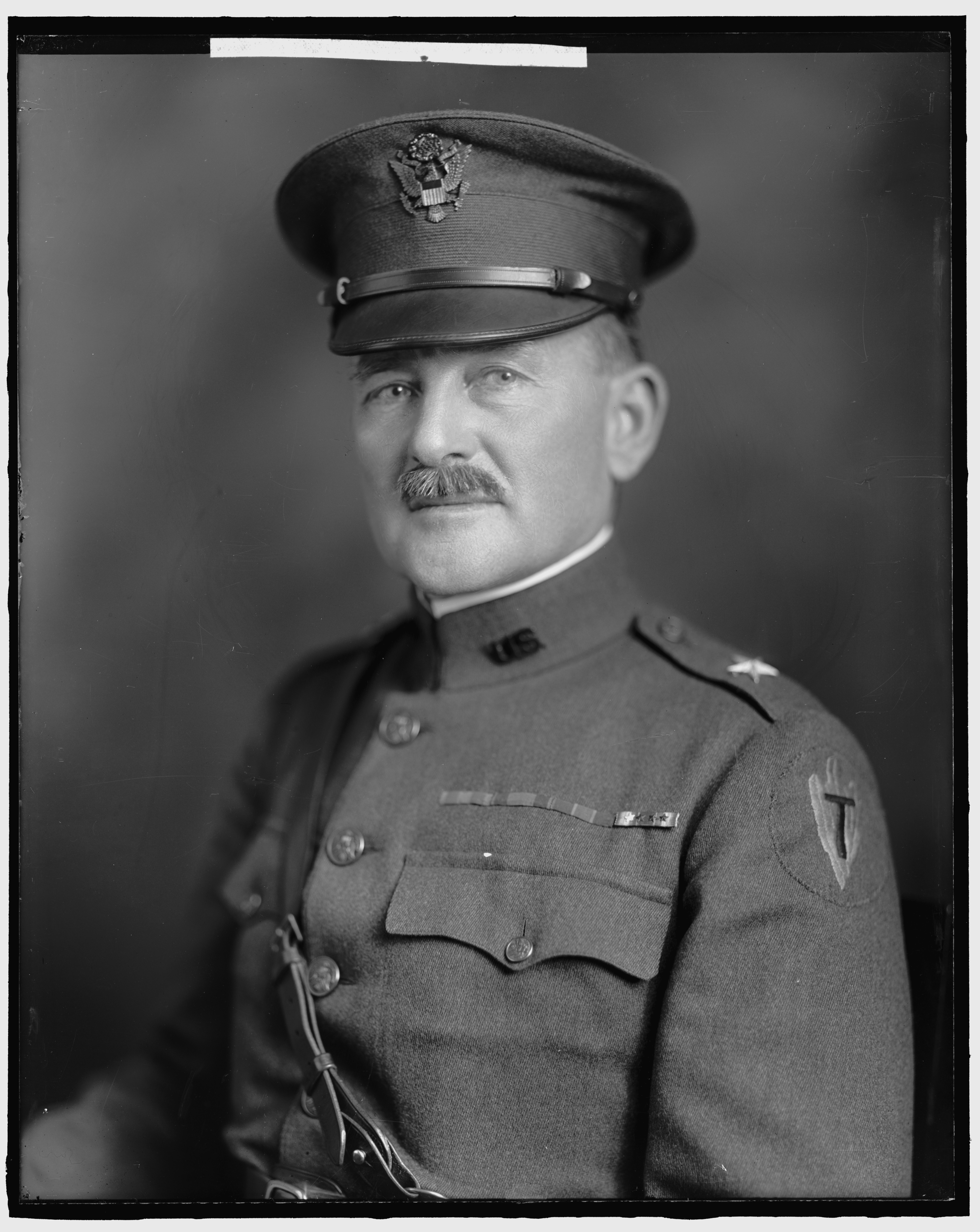
- Born: November 8, 1869; Martinsville, Virginia, United States
- Died: August 31, 1960 (aged 90); Richmond, Virginia, United States
- Spouse: Elsie T. Barbour
- Children: Osmund T. Jamerson
- Military career
- Allegiance: United States of America
- Branch: United States Army
- Service years: 1893–1933
- Rank: Brigadier general
- Commands: 159th Infantry Brigade; 72nd Infantry Brigade
- Conflicts: Spanish-American War; Philippine-American War; World War I
- Awards: Distinguished Service Medal; Silver Star

George Hairston Jamerson (November 8, 1869 – August 31, 1960) was an American brigadier general during World War I.

== Early life and education ==
George Hairston Jamerson was born on November 8, 1869, in Martinsville, Virginia.

Jamerson attended the Ruffner Institute in Martinsville, Virginia, and Virginia A and M College in Blacksburg, Virginia. He graduated from the United States Military Academy in the class of 1893.

== Career ==
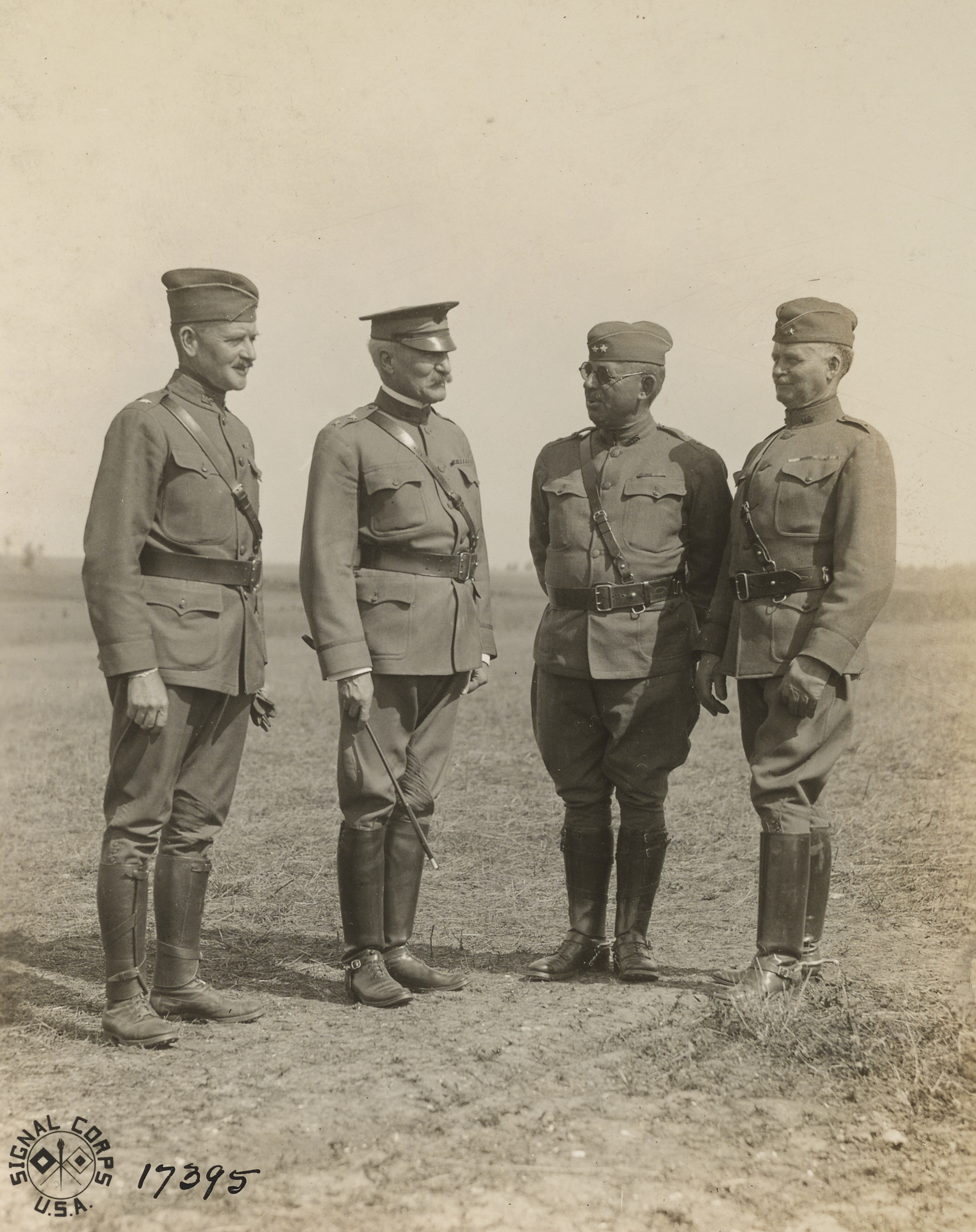
Officers at 80th Division Headquarters at Boque Maison, France, July 20, 1918. From left to right: Brigadier General George H. Jamerson, commander of the 159th Brigade, Major General George W. Read, commander of II Corps, Major General Adelbert Cronkhite, commanding the 80th Division, and Brigadier General Lloyd M. Brett, commanding the 160th Brigade.

During World War I, Jamerson commanded the 159th Infantry Brigade of the 80th Infantry Division. In the waning months of the war, Jamerson took command of the 72nd Infantry Brigade from April 1919 until they mustered out at Camp Bowie, Texas.

== Awards ==
He received the Distinguished Service Medal. The citation for the medal reads:

The President of the United States of America, authorized by Act of Congress, July 9, 1918, takes pleasure in presenting the Army Distinguished Service Medal to Brigadier General George Hairston Jamerson, United States Army, for exceptionally meritorious and distinguished services to the Government of the United States, in a duty of great responsibility during World War I. As Regimental Commander, 317th Infantry, and later as Brigade Commander of the 159th Infantry Brigade of the 80th Division, General Jamerson rendered conspicuous service in the organization and training of these units, and in the command thereof during the operations of his Brigade in the Meuse-Argonne offensive. Displaying sound judgment, high professional skill, untiring energy, and devotion to duty, General Jamerson contributed in a material way to the successful operation of his division and of the American forces in France.

His other awards include the Silver Star, Victory medal with 4 clasps, Army of Cuban Occupation Medal, Philippine Campaign Medal, and the Mexican Border Service Medal.

== Personal life ==
Jamerson married Elsie T. Barbour on October 20, 1897. Together, they had one son: Osmund T. Jamerson.

== Death and legacy ==
Jamerson died on August 31, 1960.
