= Battle of Kassel (1945) =

Battle in the Western Front of World War II

- Part of the Western Allied invasion of Germany in the Western Front of the European theatre of World War II
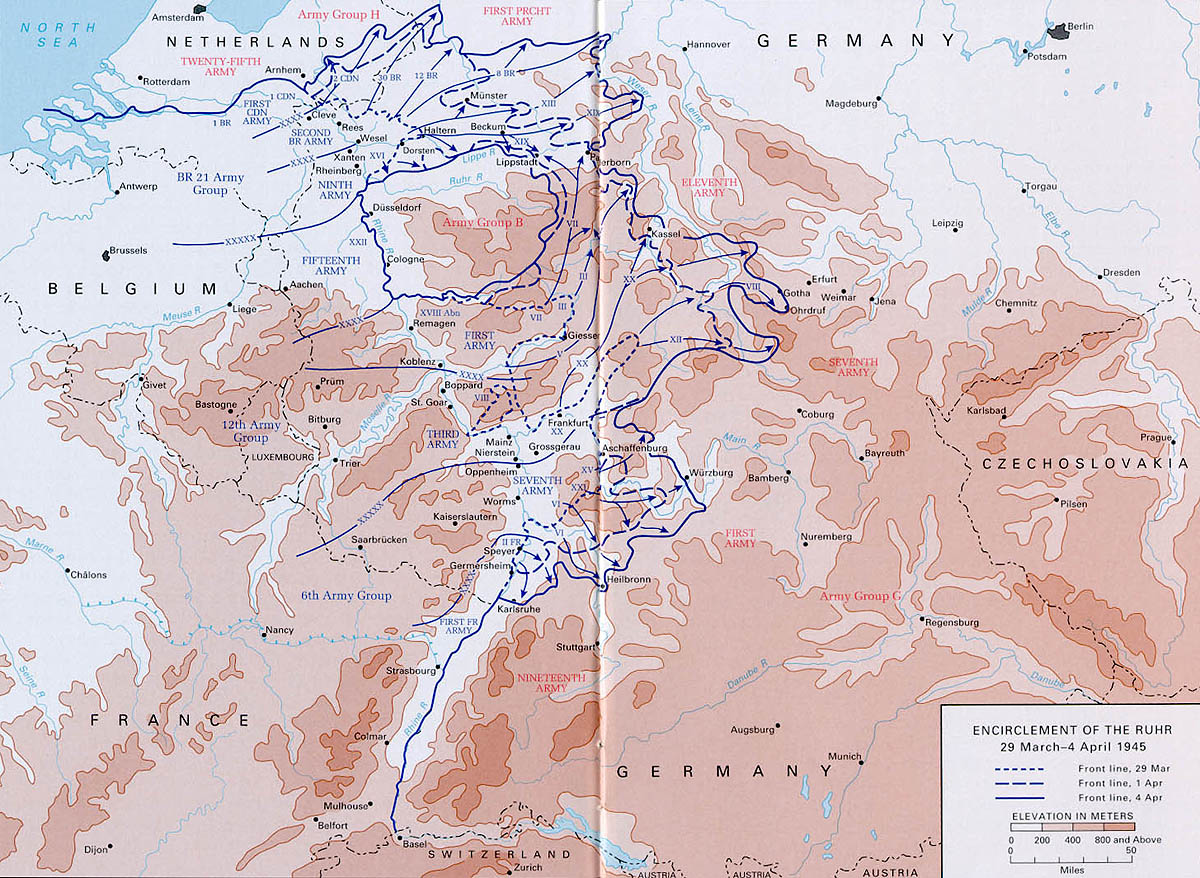
Date	1–4 April 1945
Location	Kassel, Germany 51°19′N 9°30′E
Result	American victory

Belligerents
United States	Germany

Commanders and leaders
(United States) Horace McBride	(Nazi Germany) Johannes Erxleben

Units involved
80th Infantry Division	510th Heavy Panzer Battalion; 511th Heavy Panzer Battalion; other units

Strength
	6,000

Casualties and losses
12 Tanks Destroyers destroyed	50+ killed; 5,400+ captured; 2 Tiger II Destroyed; 1 Tiger II damaged

The Battle of Kassel was a four-day struggle between the U.S. Army and the German Army in April 1945 for Kassel, a medium-sized city 140 kilometers northeast of Frankfurt am Main, which also is the second-largest city in Hesse (after Frankfurt). The battle resulted as the U.S. Third Army pushed northeast from the region of Frankfurt and Mainz. The battle opened on April 1, 1945 and ended with an American victory three days later. Opposing the Third Army's 80th Infantry Division were an infantry replacement battalion, some heavy tanks, and anti-aircraft guns. Although the Germans gave battle at Kassel, their army was on the brink of collapse as the Western Allies and the Red Army made deep inroads into Germany. The defense of Kassel did not materially impede the Allied advance, and, one month after the battle ended, Germany was forced to capitulate.

== Background ==
After the Ardennes Offensive, the U.S. Third Army had pushed east and southeast into Germany, capturing Pruem and Trier. This advance brought General Patton's troops to the Rhine River, which they crossed at Oppenheim, near Mainz, on March 22, 1945. While the U.S. First Army was marching on Paderborn, the Third Army moved on a roughly parallel course further to the east to cover the First Army's right flank and prevent any German attempt to relieve their troops trapped in the Ruhr Pocket. Moving east from its bridgehead across the Rhine, the Third Army's XII Corps fought through scattered German opposition and reached Frankfurt on March 26. After Frankfurt, Kassel was the largest city in Hessen, having had a population of 200,000 in 1939. Another corps of the Third Army, the XX, was directed to capture it. By March 30, elements of the Third Army were nearing Kassel, having moved some 220 kilometers (140 mi) in eight days.

Much of Kassel's center lay in ruins as the city had been bombed 40 times by the Allied air forces. Among the bombing targets in the city was the Henschel factory complex, which produced Tiger II tanks. As the Americans approached, the Henschel Works finished work on thirteen Tiger II tanks, which were taken over by two companies of the German 510th and 511th Heavy Tank Battalions. Deployed on a military training ground south of the city was a battery of 88 mm anti-aircraft guns manned by Reichsarbeitdienst (RAD) members, a paramilitary labor service of the Nazi Party. Besides the tanks and AA-guns, the Germans had several hundred men of the 15th Armored Infantry Replacement and Training Battalion with which to defend the city. The German high command had designated Kassel a Festung (fortress) with dire orders to "resist to the last round". In the event, however, the designation of the city as Festung had little impact on the outcome of the battle. In command of the city's defense was Generalmajor Johannes Erxleben, a communications officer with little battle experience.

== Battle ==
On March 30, 1945, seven German Tiger II tanks rolled south, heading for Fritzlar. 3 kilometres (1.9 mi) northeast of Fritzlar, the Tigers fought a meeting engagement with an armored spearhead of the U.S. Third Army, resulting in damage or destruction to six U.S. tank destroyers. The German tanks, however, were forced to retreat when their unit was subjected to heavy artillery fire. On April 1, leading elements of Major General Horace L. McBride's U.S. 80th Infantry Division approached Kassel from the south, but were forced to halt by fire from the RAD anti-aircraft battery positioned on the Dönche training ground (51°17′21″N 09°25′56″E), a relatively flat area that allowed the 88mm guns to engage in long range fire.

On April 2, the Americans again responded with heavy artillery fire, destroying the RAD AA battery. The U.S. 318th Infantry Regiment moved a battalion into the wooded high ground (Habichtswald) west of Kassel, while the U.S. 319th Infantry Regiment crossed the Fulda River and moved north along its east bank. The 80th Division's third regiment, the 317th Infantry, was in divisional reserve. By the end of the day, western and southern suburbs of Kassel had been occupied by the Americans.

In the south, German infantry of the 15th Battalion mounted 15 half-tracks and, supported by about 12 tanks, moved south and surprised elements of the 1st Battalion, 318th Infantry. The subsequent exchange of fire saw six U.S. tank destroyers knocked out and one Tiger II damaged. The German infantry was separated from their tanks by enfilading fire from U.S. troops who had pulled back from the road. The German tanks continued south until they were struck by an American 155-mm artillery barrage that destroyed two tanks with direct hits. A second and similar German assault was less successful and also repelled by artillery fire.

Having reorganized, 80th Division troops, with the support of M16 half-tracks that mounted four heavy machine guns, closed on the German Kaserne from which the attack the previous day had originated. M16's of the 633rd Anti-Aircraft Artillery (Heavy Weapons) Battalion subjected the German base and its defenders to blistering fire and forced the capitulation of the base's garrison.

The U.S. 318th Infantry's advance north into Kassel was blocked by a 15-meter high railway embankment under which a street ran. The underpass was blocked by a German self-propelled gun whose fire commanded the approach to the underpass. After American attempts to take the embankment were repelled by Germans dug in on the other side, the regiment's 1st Battalion managed to cross the embankment to the northwest and approached the German positions from the flank. Early on the morning of April 3, the battalion took the surrender of some 500 German troops who believed their defensive position was compromised.

Fighting in Kassel was house-to-house from April 2, but the German defenders were too few to defend effectively and the U.S. forces pushed into the city's center, fending off local counter-attacks by infantry and tanks. American tanks and the U.S. 319th Infantry were meanwhile approaching Kassel from the east bank of the Fulda River. The U.S. 317th Infantry was guarding the Americans' flank in the west and the U.S. 318th Infantry pushed through the city, arriving in the vicinity of the command bunker of General Erxleben at 0900 on April 4, 1945. Faced with the collapse of his defenses, Erxleben dispatched a captain early on April 4 to discuss surrender terms with the Americans. The American reply was that the Germans had to cease resistance with no cease-fire to evacuate wounded or civilians, or that the fighting would continue. Around 1100 on April 4, U.S. tanks crossed the Fulda River from the east and moved toward the center of Kassel. At 1200, General Erxleben capitulated and was taken prisoner along with 1,325 others, effectively ending the Battle of Kassel.

== Bibliography ==
- Eisenhower's Lieutenants, Russell F. Weigley, Bloomington: Indiana University Press, 1981. ISBN 0-253-13333-5.
- Krieg in der Heimat … bis zum bitteren Ende im Harz, Ulrich Saft, Walsrode: Militärbuchverlag Saft, 1996. ISBN 3-9801789-2-7.
