= Lloyd Milton Brett =

United States Army general

Brigadier General Lloyd Milton Brett
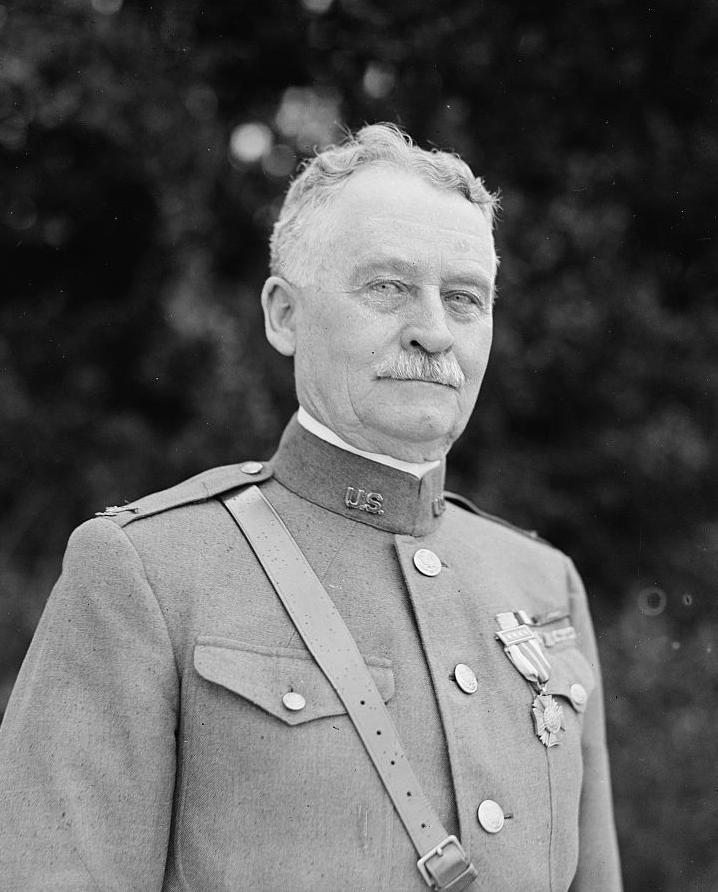
- Lloyd M. Brett
- Born: February 22, 1856 near Dead River, Maine, US
- Died: September 23, 1927 (aged 71); Washington, D.C., US
- Burial place: Arlington National Cemetery
- Military career
- Allegiance: United States of America
- Branch: United States Army
- Service years: 1879–1920
- Rank: Brigadier General
- Unit: 2nd Cavalry Regiment
- Commands: 3rd Cavalry Regiment; 160th Infantry Brigade; 80th Infantry Division
- Conflicts: American Indian Wars; World War I
- Awards: Medal of Honor; Distinguished Service Medal; Legion of Honor; Croix de Guerre

Lloyd Milton Brett (February 22, 1856 – September 23, 1927) was a United States Army brigadier general who was a recipient of the Medal of Honor for valor in action on April 1, 1880, at O'Fallon's Creek, Montana. He graduated from West Point and served in numerous campaigns on the Western Frontier and later in World War I. He retired as a brigadier general in 1920.

== Early life and family ==
Brett was born near Dead River, Maine on February 22, 1856. On July 1, 1875, he accepted an appointment to the United States Military Academy at West Point and graduated in 1879. He married Emma Wallace (1865–1948) on February 7, 1887, and on October 13, 1889, they had a daughter, Helen Brett.

== Military career ==
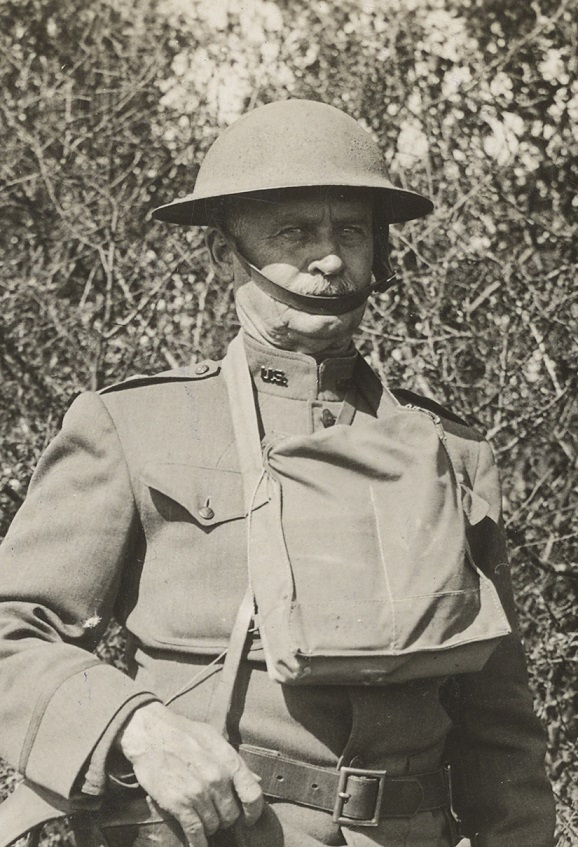
Lloyd Milton Brett as Brigadier General near Stainville 1918, with his M1917 Helmet

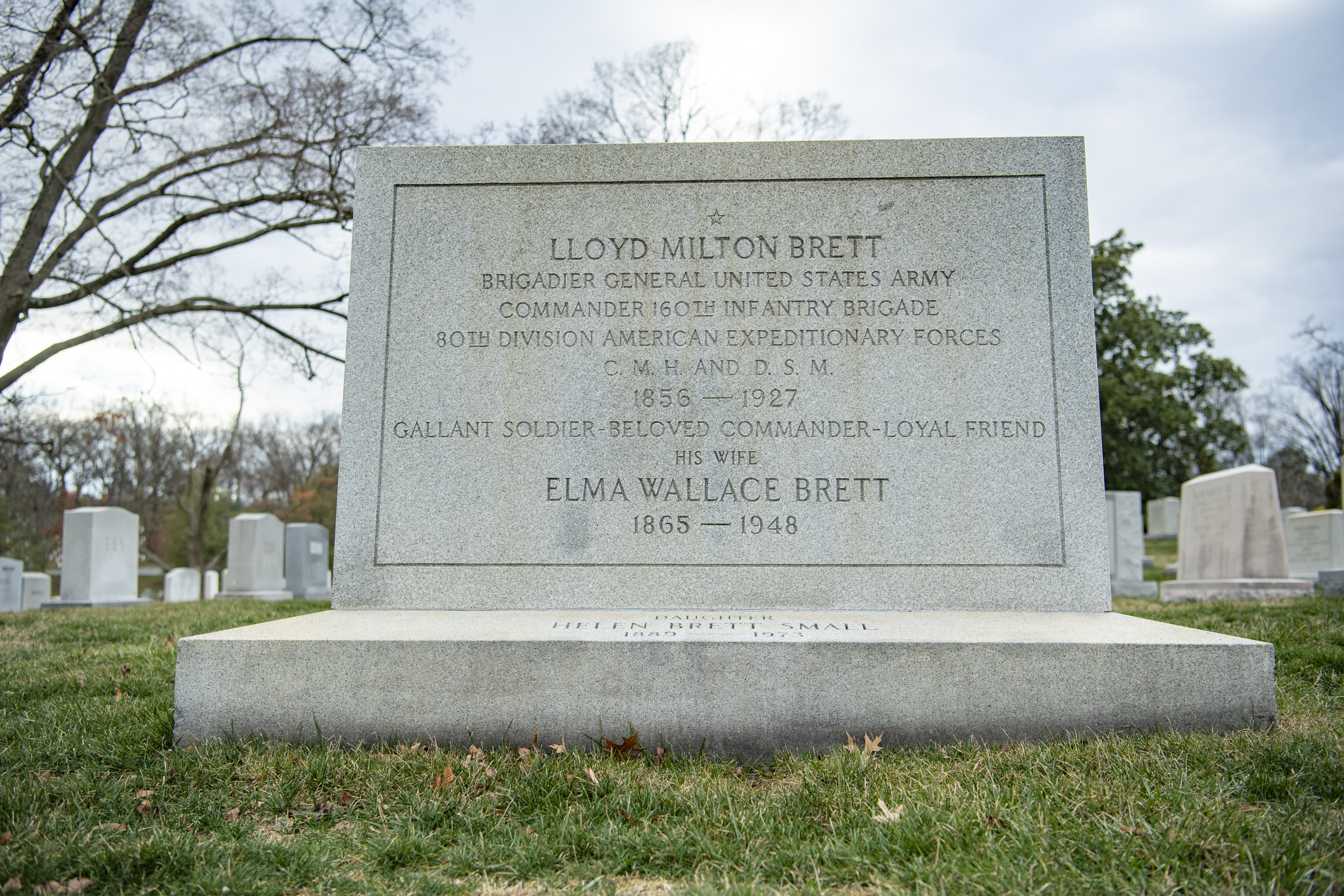
Grave at Arlington National Cemetery

After graduation, he received a commission on June 13, 1879, as a Second Lieutenant, in the 2nd United States Cavalry.

While a member of the 2d U.S. Cavalry during the American Indian Wars, he participated in the pursuit of a group of Sioux Indians who had stolen a herd of ponies. On April 1, 1880, the group was located by scouts making camp with the herd at the head of O'Fallon Creek. In what would later be known as the Battle of O'Fallons Creek he was ordered to take ten soldiers and attempt to capture the complete herd. The soldiers were able to retrieve the herd and cut the Indians off from their horses as well. When the Indian group attempted to get to their horses and escape they were driven away, causing them to separate. In the action one of the Indians was killed and five were captured, while the rest escaped into a nearby group of trees. When Brett and his men tried to approach the trees, the Indians, who had lain down on the ground inside the woods, opened fire on the troops. In the battle one soldier was shot in the head and one horse was hurt and the soldiers' attack had been repelled. While the soldiers considered their next move, the Indians moved into a more defensible position, although completely surrounded. By this point it was getting dark and the soldiers were cold and tired from the day's fighting and they determined it unfeasible to attack. At some point the Indian group escaped from their position without a trace and escaped. For his actions during the battle, Brett received the Medal of Honor, which was presented to him February 7, 1895.

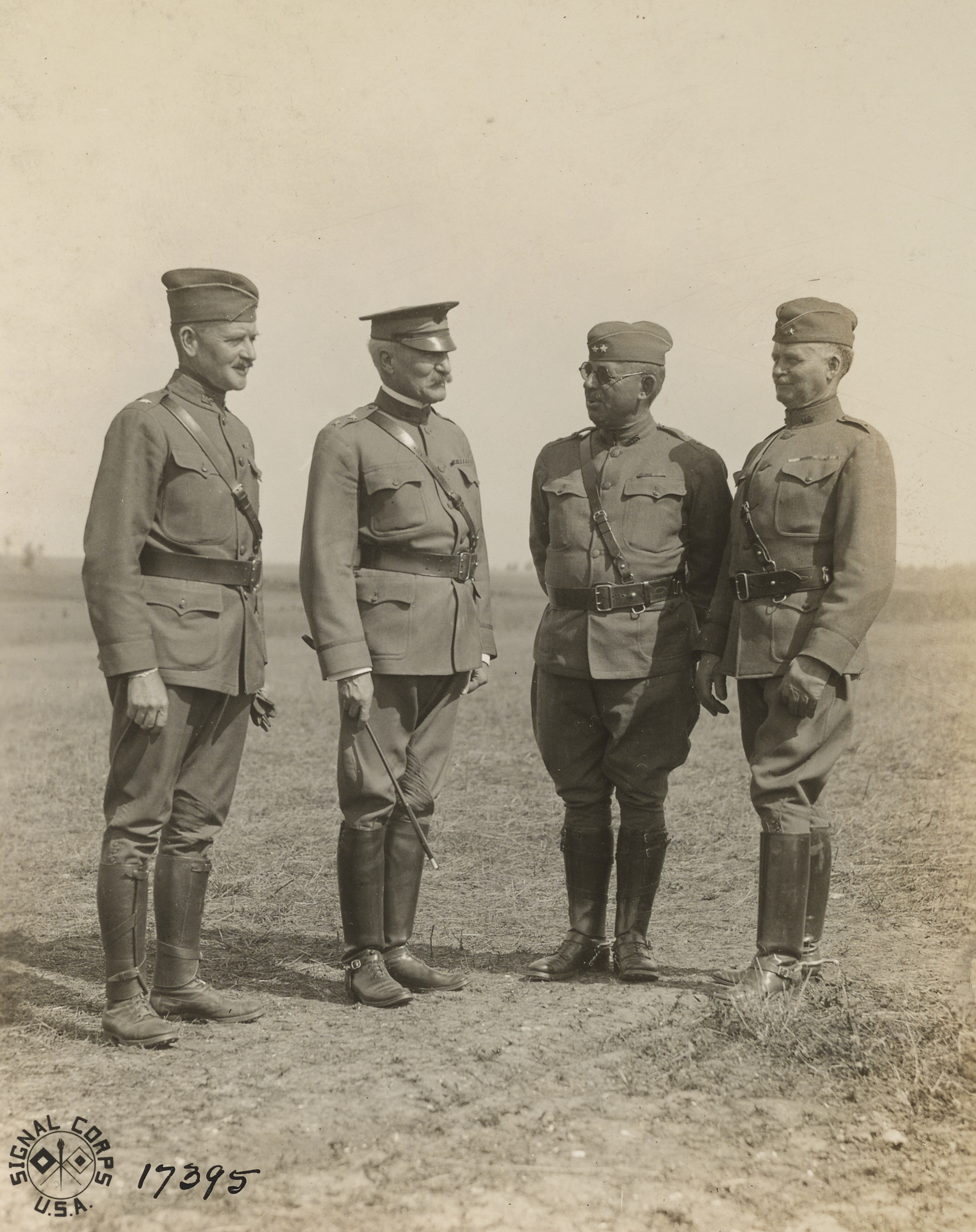
Officers at 80th Division Headquarters at Boque Maison, France, July 20, 1918. From left to right: Brigadier General George H. Jamerson, commander of the 159th Brigade, Major General George W. Read, commander of II Corps, Major General Adelbert Cronkhite, commanding the 80th Division, and Brigadier General Lloyd M. Brett, commanding the 160th Brigade.

He was honorably mustered out of the Volunteers on June 18, 1901, at the rank of lieutenant colonel. In 1903, he was assigned to be the adjutant general of the D.C. Militia and kept that post until 1908. From 1910 to 1916 he served as acting superintendent of Yellowstone National Park and then in September 1917 he commanded the 160th Infantry Brigade, Camp Lee, Petersburg, Virginia.

He was promoted to brigadier general on August 5, 1917, and served overseas with the 80th Infantry Division from May 1918–June 1919 in World War I. While serving in World War I he received the Army Distinguished Service medal for commanding the 80th Infantry Division and their actions near Imecourt and Buzancy in November when they broke the enemy's resistance.

== Death and legacy ==
He died on September 23, 1927, and was buried in Arlington National Cemetery Arlington, Virginia. His grave can be found in section 6, Grave 8367. When his wife Emma died March 31, 1948, she was buried with him, and when their daughter died May 11, 1973, she was buried with them as well.

== Honors and awards ==
In addition to the Medal of Honor he also received the Distinguished Service Medal, Officer of the Legion of Honor, and Croix de Guerre.

=== Medal of Honor citation ===
Rank and organization: Second Lieutenant, 2d U.S. Cavalry. Place and date: At O'Fallons Creek, Mont., April 1, 1880. Entered service at: Malden, Mass. Born: February 22, 1856, Dead River, Maine. Date of issue: February 7, 1895.

Citation:

Fearless exposure and dashing bravery in cutting off the Indians' pony herd, thereby greatly crippling the hostiles.

=== Army Distinguished Service Medal citation ===
Citation:

The President of the United States of America, authorized by Act of Congress, July 9, 1918, takes pleasure in presenting the Army Distinguished Service Medal to Brigadier General Lloyd M. Brett, United States Army, for exceptionally meritorious and distinguished services to the Government of the United States, in a duty of great responsibility during World War I. General Brett commanded the 160th Infantry Brigade with particular efficiency in the markedly successful operations resulting in the occupation of the Dannevoux sector in October 1918. In the actions near Imecourt and Buzancy in November his brigade broke the enemy's resistance. Due to his masterful ability and brilliant leadership, these operations proved a crowning success.

== See also ==
- List of Medal of Honor recipients for the Indian Wars

== Bibliography ==
Davis, Henry Blaine Jr. (1998). Generals in Khaki. Raleigh, North Carolina: Pentland Press, Inc. pp. 49–50. ISBN 1-57197-088-6.
