= Walter E. Lauer =

American military officer

Walter Ernst Lauer
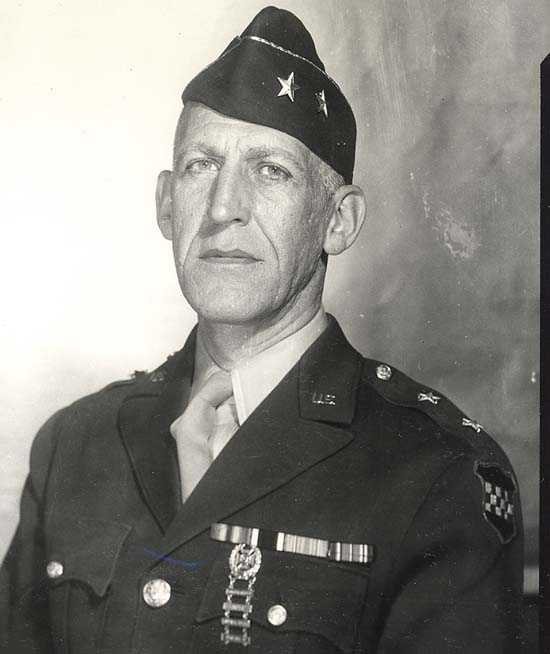
- Born: June 29, 1893; Brooklyn, New York, United States
- Died: October 13, 1966 (aged 73); Monterey, California, United States
- Burial place: Golden Gate National Cemetery, San Bruno, California, United States
- Military career
- Allegiance: United States
- Branch: United States Army
- Service years: 1917–1946
- Rank: Major General
- Service number: 0-7486
- Unit: Infantry Branch
- Commands: 99th Infantry Division; 80th Infantry Division; 66th Infantry Division
- Conflicts: World War I World War II
- Awards: Distinguished Service Cross; Distinguished Service Medal (2); Silver Star

Major General Walter E. Lauer (29 June 1893 – 13 October 1966) was a senior United States Army officer who fought in both World War I and World War II. During World War II he commanded the 99th Infantry Division in the Battle of the Bulge. The green troops of the 99th, along with the battle-tested 2nd Infantry Division, held a key sector controlling access to Spa and Liege and large repositories of ammunition, fuel, and supplies. Despite being outnumbered by German forces at least five to one, during the Battle of Elsenborn Ridge they did not yield. It was the only sector of the American front lines during the German offensive where the Germans failed to advance.

== Early life ==
Walter Ernst Lauer was born in Brooklyn, New York, the son of Albert and Anna Rehlmeyer Lauer. He attended Cornell University, and left in his junior year to enlist in the United States Army for World War I. He completed training at Madison Barracks, New York, and was commissioned as a second lieutenant in the Infantry Branch. He attended the School of Small Arms from 1917 to 1918. He married Lily Grace Hunter of East Hampton. Massachusetts on June 9, 1918, and they had two children, Helen Ivy Bohin and Hunter Lauer.

Lauer had five brothers. His brother Alexander commented, "There were five boys in our family, and with the exception of Walter, we were all doctors or pharmacists." Lauer also had two sisters, Mrs. Ernst Schaefer, a New Rochelle pharmacist, and Mrs. H. R. Evans of Brooklyn.

== Military service ==
=== World War I ===
During World War I he served overseas with the American Expeditionary Forces (AEF) on the Western Front in the First Army as an adjutant in III Corps Schools and received a temporary promotion to first lieutenant on June 17, 1918, while he was serving in the 1st Division.

=== Interwar years ===
He was on occupation duty in Coblenz for four years after the war. Lauer was promoted to captain on 1 July 1920. His daughter, Helen Ivy Lauer, was born July 1921 in Koblenz.

Upon his return to the United States, Lauer assumed command of the Organized Reserves; he served in Reading, Pennsylvania, from 1923 to 1926. He attended the U.S. Army Infantry School at Fort Benning, Georgia from 15 September 1926 to 28 May 1927.

Lauer was assistant professor of Military Science and Tactics at University of Vermont from 1927 until 1930. His son, Hunter Lauer, was born on 11 January 1928.

He then served as G-3 and executive officer (XO) of the 4th Brigade, part of the 2nd Infantry Division stationed at Fort Francis E. Warren, Wyoming, from 1930 to 1935. On 1 August 1935, he was promoted to major. He was Professor of Military Science and Tactics at St. Norbert College, De Pere, Wisconsin, for the 1936–37 academic year. Lauer attended the U.S. Army Command and General Staff College at Fort Leavenworth, Kansas, graduating on 20 June 1938. From 1939 through 1940, he served first with the 30th Infantry Regiment, a National Guard formation, at the Presidio of San Francisco, where he was promoted to lieutenant colonel on 18 August 1940, during World War II (although the United States was neutral at this point), and later at Fort Lewis, Washington, he was appointed G-4 of the 3rd Infantry Division.

=== World War II ===
On 24 December 1941, less than three weeks after the United States entered World War II, he was promoted to the temporary rank of colonel and appointed chief of staff of the 3rd Infantry Division, a Regular Army formation, and he took part in planning and leading the 3rd Division's amphibious warfare training and worked out special equipment and special operating procedures for amphibious operations. He landed with the division at Fedala during Operation Brushwood on 8 November 1942, and helped capture Casablanca in the opening stages of the Allied invasion of North Africa. When his unit performed so well at Casablanca, Lauer was promoted to the one-star rank of brigadier general on February 3, 1943. He was reassigned as the assistant division commander (ADC) of the 93rd Infantry Division, an African-American formation commanded by Major General Raymond G. Lehman. The division was then stationed at Fort Huachuca, Arizona. "It's hard to leave one's friends in a combat zone," he said, "especially when you are not permitted to share in their troubles and pleasures." On August 2, 1943, he was given command of the 99th Infantry Division, taking over from Major General Thompson Lawrence.

Lauer was promoted to the two-star rank of major general on January 15, 1944 and trained his division for eventual deployment overseas. He took the 99th, consisting almost entirely of conscripts (or draftees), to England on October 10, 1944, and arrived with his troops on the Western Front on November 4, 1944. They were moved rapidly into the front line on 11 November 1944, just 35 days before the German Army's winter offensive of 1944 hit the 99th. The 99th was assigned to hold a 22 miles (35 km) long front.

==== Battle of the Bulge ====
The green 99th ID faced a German force that during the Battle of the Bulge on the northern shoulder at Elsenborn Ridge was judged to be 5 to 15 times greater in size. Their widely spaced, untested troops managed to hold the north shoulder of that Bulge, substantially delaying the German time table and helping to turn the tide of the last German offensive of World War II. The determined effort and short time in front line combat led to UP correspondent John McDermott nicknaming the 99th as the "Battle Babies." In 1951 Lauer published Battle Babies: the Story of the 99th Infantry Division in World War II, a book about the division's actions

He continued to command the 99th Division for the invasion of Germany in March 1945, and through the war in Europe’s end in early May. He was Commanding General (CG) of the 66th Infantry Division from August to October 1945; of the 80th Infantry Division from October to December 1945; and of the 66th Infantry Division again from December 1945 to its deactivation in October 1946, all three of which were serving in the European Theater of Operations (ETO).

Lauer retired from military service on 31 March 1946, but worked in Europe for the United Nations Relief and Rehabilitation Administration until early 1947.

For his services during World War II he was awarded the Army Distinguished Service Medal.

== Later life ==
He returned to the United States and moved to Monterey, California, near Fort Ord, the successor to Gigling Reservation, which he helped found and build in 1941 and 1942. Lauer had an open door policy to anyone who wanted to drop by at 3:00 on any afternoon to pass the time and say hello. Lauer died of cancer on 13 October 1966, at the Fort Ord Army Hospital. He was inurned at the Golden Gate National Cemetery near San Francisco on 15 October 1966. He requested that he be buried in a plain pine box, like any other soldier, which was honored. On 16 February 1974, his wife of 48 years was buried beside him.

== Decorations ==
`

1st Row	Distinguished Service Cross		Army Distinguished Service Medal with Oak Leaf Cluster		Silver Star with two Oak Leaf Clusters	Fourragère
2nd Row	Legion of Merit	Bronze Star Medal with Oak Leaf Cluster and V for Valor	World War I Victory Medal		Army of Occupation of Germany Medal	Fourragère
3rd Row	American Defense Service Medal	American Campaign Medal	European-African-Middle Eastern Campaign Medal with five service stars		World War II Victory Medal	Fourragère
4th Row	Army of Occupation Medal	National Defense Service Medal	Officer of the Legion of Honor (France)		French Croix de guerre 1939–1945 with Palm	Fourragère
5th Row	Order of the Red Banner (Union of Soviet Socialist Republics)		Czechoslovak Order of the White Lion, 3rd Class	Czechoslovak War Cross 1939–1945	Purple Heart	Fourragère

Military offices
Preceded by Thompson Lawrence	Commanding General 99th Infantry Division; 1943–1945	Succeeded by Frederick H. Black
Preceded by Herman F. Kramer	Commanding General 66th Infantry Division; August–October 1945	Succeeded by Post deactivated
Preceded by Horace L. McBride	Commanding General 80th Infantry Division; October–December 1945	Succeeded by Post deactivated
