= Horace L. McBride =

United States Army general (1894–1962)

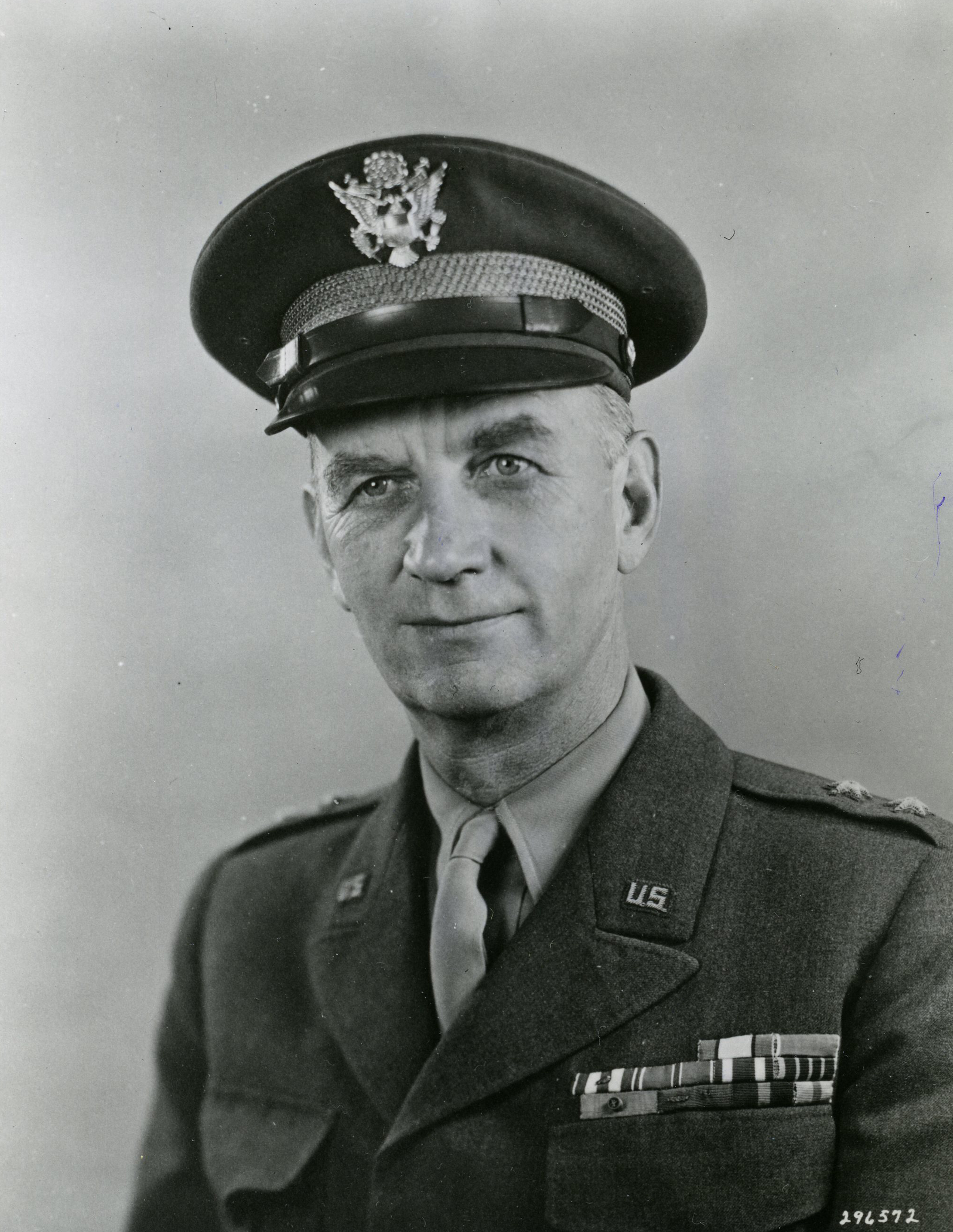
- Born: June 29, 1894; Madison, Nebraska, United States
- Died: November 14, 1962 (aged 68); Orlando, Florida, United States
- Burial place: Arlington National Cemetery, Virginia, United States
- Military career
- Allegiance: United States
- Branch: United States Army
- Service years: 1916–1954
- Rank: Lieutenant General
- Service number: 0-4430
- Unit: Field Artillery Branch
- Commands: 1st Battalion, 2nd Field Artillery Regiment; 80th Infantry Division; XX Corps; 9th Infantry Division; Caribbean Command; United States Army Command and General Staff College
- Conflicts: World War I World War II

Lieutenant General Horace Logan McBride (June 29, 1894 – November 14, 1962) was a senior United States Army officer who fought during both World War I and World War II. He commanded American forces in the Ardennes (Battle of the Bulge), the Rhineland, and Central Europe during World War II.

== Early life and military career ==
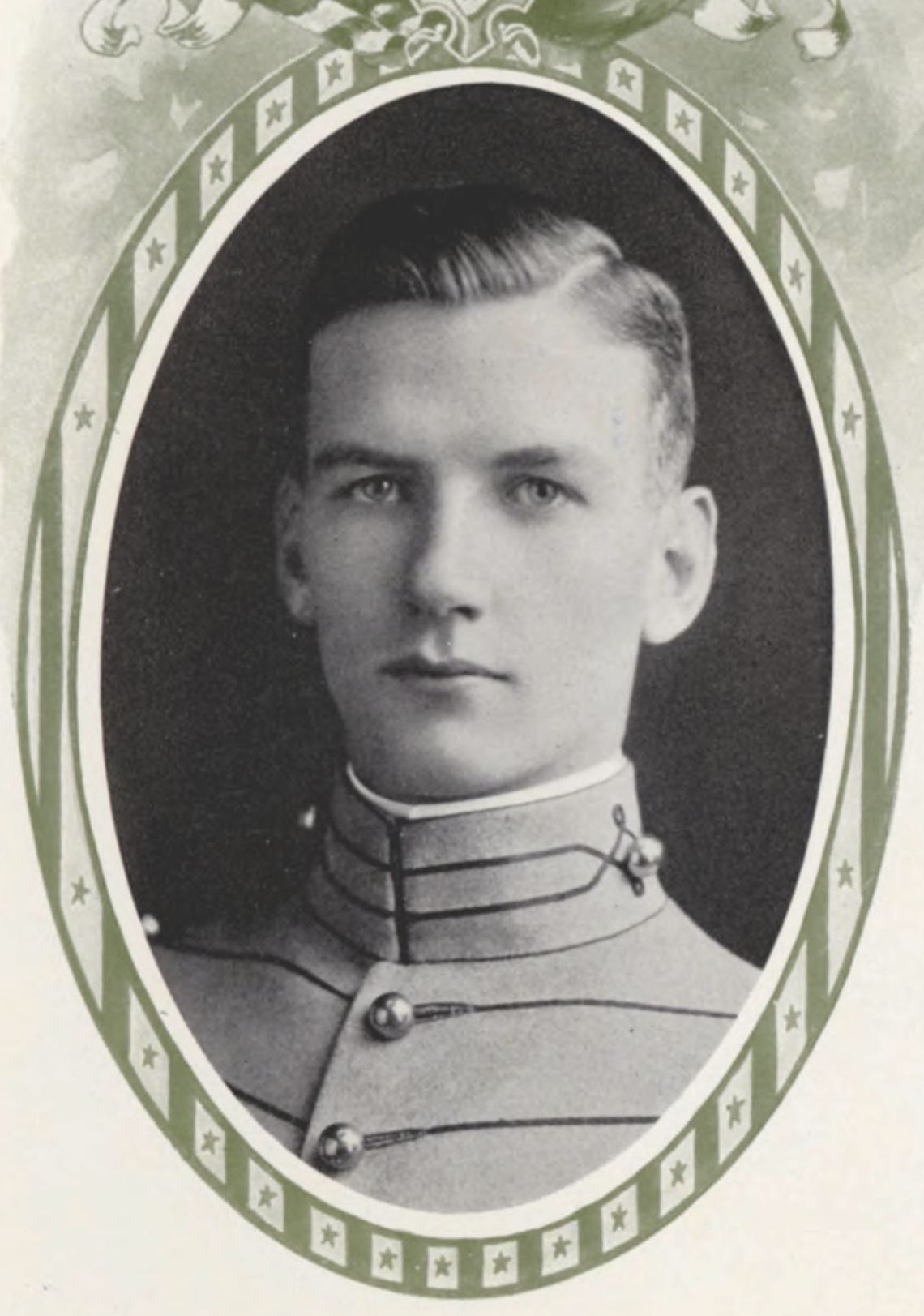
At West Point in 1916

He attended the University of Nebraska from 1910 to 1911, and then attended and graduated from the United States Military Academy (USMA) at West Point, New York in June 1916, graduating 49th in a class of 125. His fellow graduates included future generals such as William M. Hoge, Stanley Eric Reinhart, Calvin DeWitt Jr., Wilhelm D. Styer, Fay B. Prickett, Dwight Johns and Robert Neyland.

On commissioning as a second lieutenant into the Field Artillery Branch, he served as a battery commander in the 347th Field Artillery Regiment, 91st Division, in World War I with the American Expeditionary Force (AEF) under General John Joseph Pershing. He served on the Western Front, taking part in the Meuse–Argonne offensive towards the end of 1918.

He remained in the army after the war, serving as Assistant Military Attaché at The Hague, The Netherlands, and then in Warsaw, Poland in 1919. McBride was Professor of Military Science and Tactics at Yale University from 1923 until 1927. In 1928 he attended and graduated from the Command and General Staff School at Fort Leavenworth, Kansas. He was an instructor at the Field Artillery School from 1928 to 1932, then served in the Philippines from 1932 until 1935. After graduating from the Army War College in 1936, he served as an instructor at the Command and General Staff College from 1936 until 1940. He was stationed at the Panama Canal Zone from 1940 to 1942.

== World War II ==
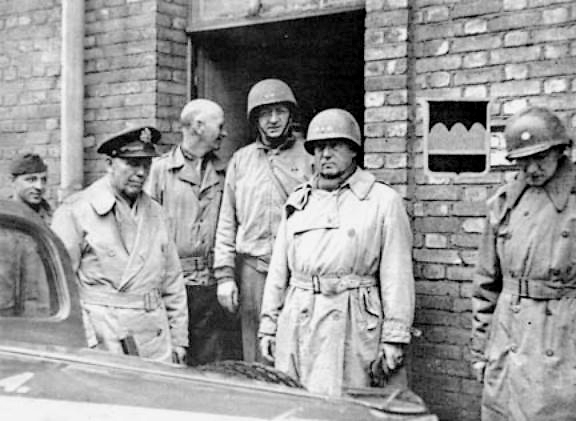
Shown from left to right are: an unidentified driver, General George C. Marshall, Major General Horace L. McBride, Major General Manton S. Eddy, Lieutenant General George S. Patton, and an unidentified aide.

From April 1942 to March 1943, he served as commander of the artillery of the 80th Infantry Division. McBride was promoted to brigadier general in May 1942. He assumed command of the entire 80th Infantry Division in 1943 and was promoted to major general in March 1943. He led the division overseas the following year, where it fought in the Battle of Normandy in the summer of 1944 and throughout the rest of the campaign in Western Europe until Germany's surrender in May 1945, by which time the 80th had suffered over 25,000 casualties. He then served as commanding general of the XX Corps from 1945 until 1946.

== Post World War II and the Cold War ==
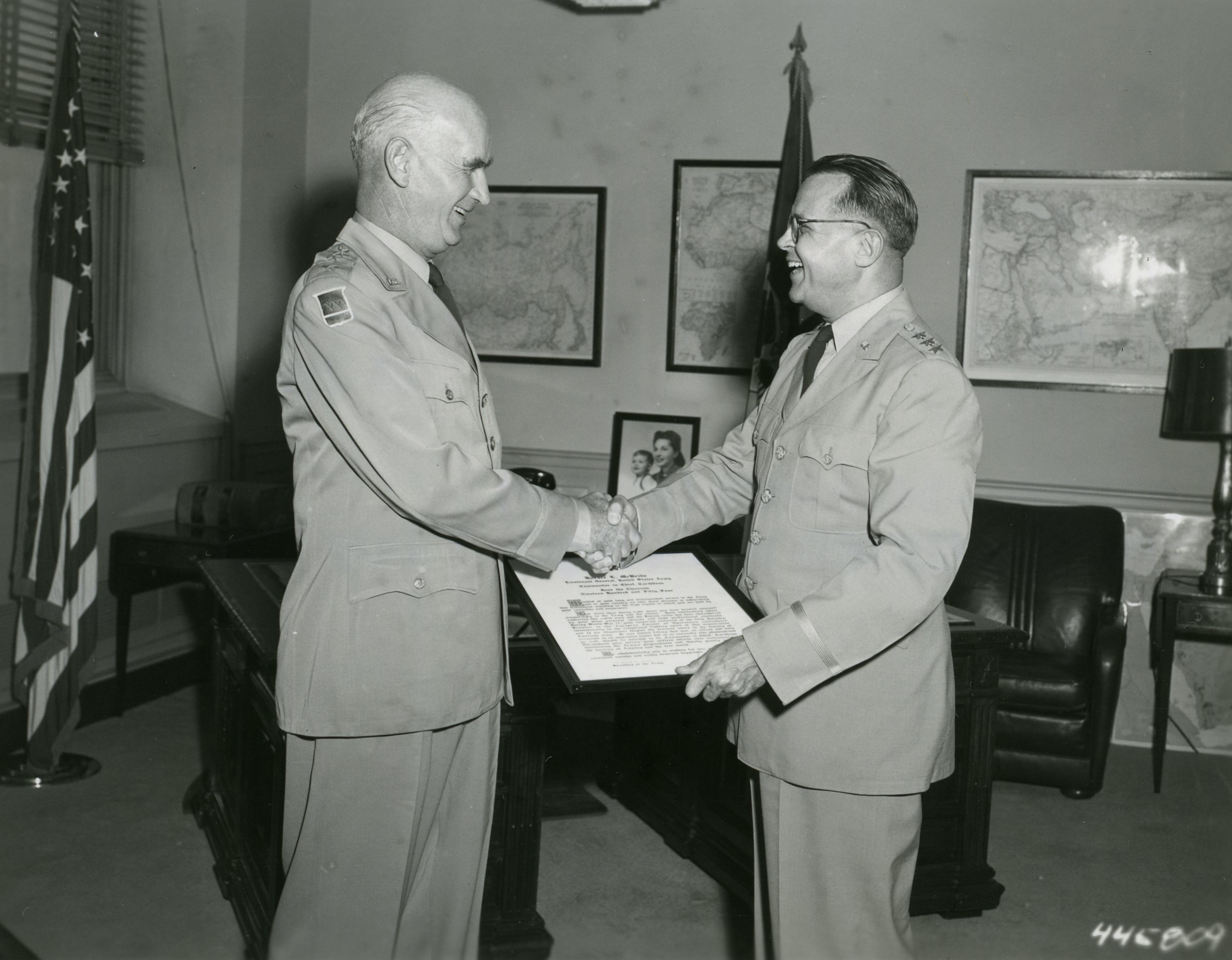
McBride is presented a scroll by Lt. Gen. Walter L. Weible on his retirement after 38 years of service, during ceremonies in the Pentagon

From 1946 until 1947, McBride served as commanding general of the 9th Division. He served as the first chief of the newly formed Joint American Military Mission for Aid to Turkey (JAMMAT) between 1947 and 1950. He was commandant of the Command and General Staff College from 1950 until 1952. From 1953 until 1954, he oversaw the Caribbean Command as its commander-in-chief.

He retired in June 1954. Upon his death in 1962 he was buried at Arlington National Cemetery in Arlington, Virginia.

== Decorations ==
His awards included the Distinguished Service Medal, two Silver Stars, the Legion of Merit, the Bronze Star and the Army Commendation Medal.

- Distinguished Service Medal
- Silver Star with oak leaf cluster
- Legion of Merit
- Bronze Star
- Army Commendation Ribbon
- Order of Alexander Nevsky (USSR)
- Order of the Patriotic War First Class (USSR)

Military offices
Preceded by Harlan N. Hartness	Commandant of the Command and General Staff College; March 1952 - March 1954	Succeeded by Henry I. Hodes
Preceded by Jesse A. Ladd	Commanding general, 9th Infantry Division; March 1, 1946 to January 15, 1947	Succeeded by William W. Eagles
Preceded by Joseph D. Patch	Commanding general, 80th Infantry Division; March 1943 – October 1945	Succeeded by Walter E. Lauer
