= 80th Training Command =

US Army formation

- 80th Infantry Division shoulder sleeve insignia
- Active: 5 August 1917–5 June 1919 (National Army); 24 June 1921–18 June 1951 (Organized Reserve); 18 June 1951–6 March 1959 (80th Airborne Div.); 6 March 1959–16 September 2008 (80th Training Div.); 16 September 2008–present (80th Training Command)
- Country: United States
- Allegiance: United States Army Reserve Command
- Branch: United States Army Reserve
- Type: Training
- Size: Command (military formation)
- Part of: United States Army Recruiting Command
- Garrison/HQ: Richmond, Virginia
- Nickname: "Blue Ridge"
- Motto: Only Moves Forward
- Engagements: World War I; Somme Offensive; Meuse-Argonne; World War II; Northern France; Rhineland; Ardennes-Alsace; Central Europe
- Website: www.usar.army.mil/80thTC/

Commanders
- Current commander: Maj. Gen. Michael J. Dougherty
- Command Sergeant Major: CSM Rogelio James Jr.
- Notable commanders: Lloyd Brett, Horace McBride; James B. Cress

Insignia
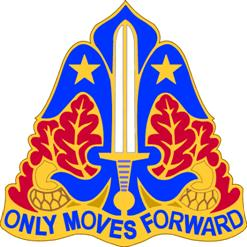
- Distinctive unit insignia

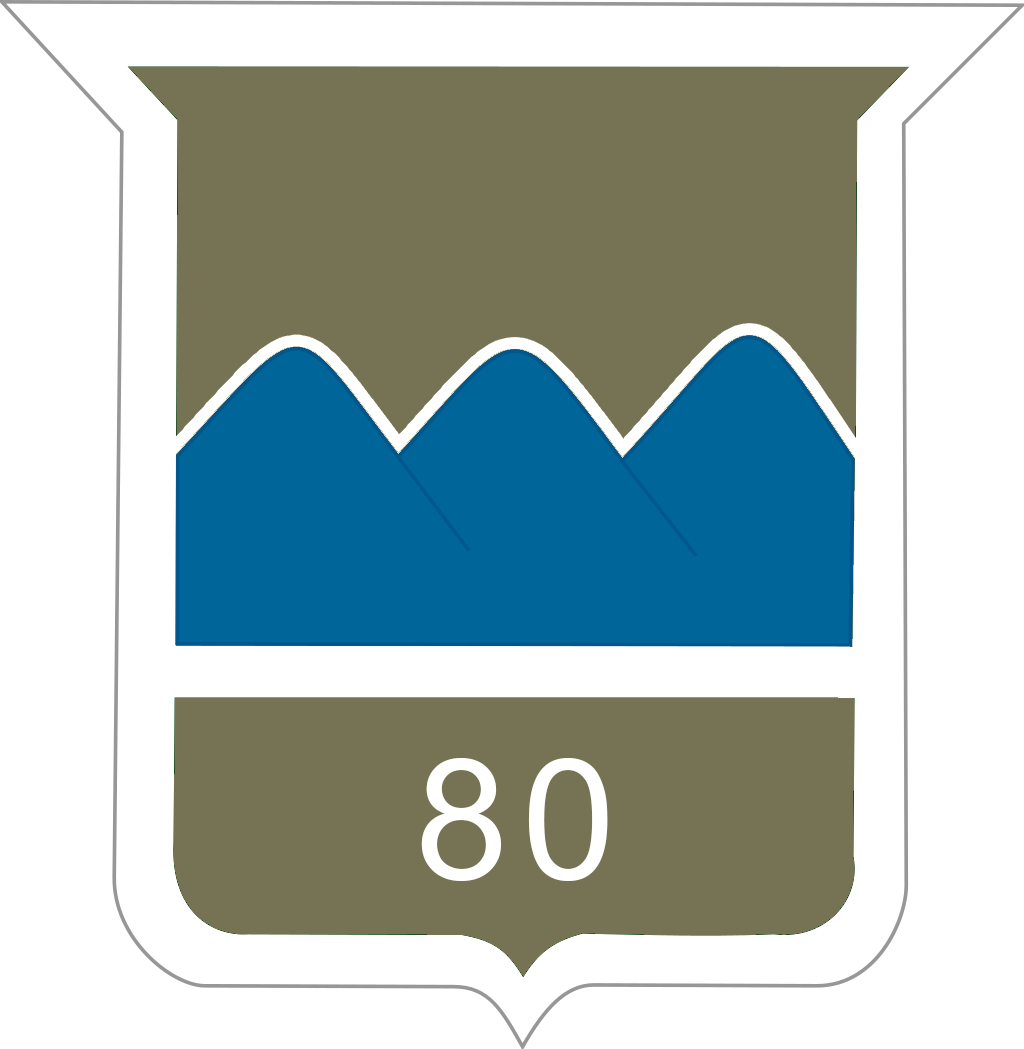
- 80th Infantry Division WWI SSI

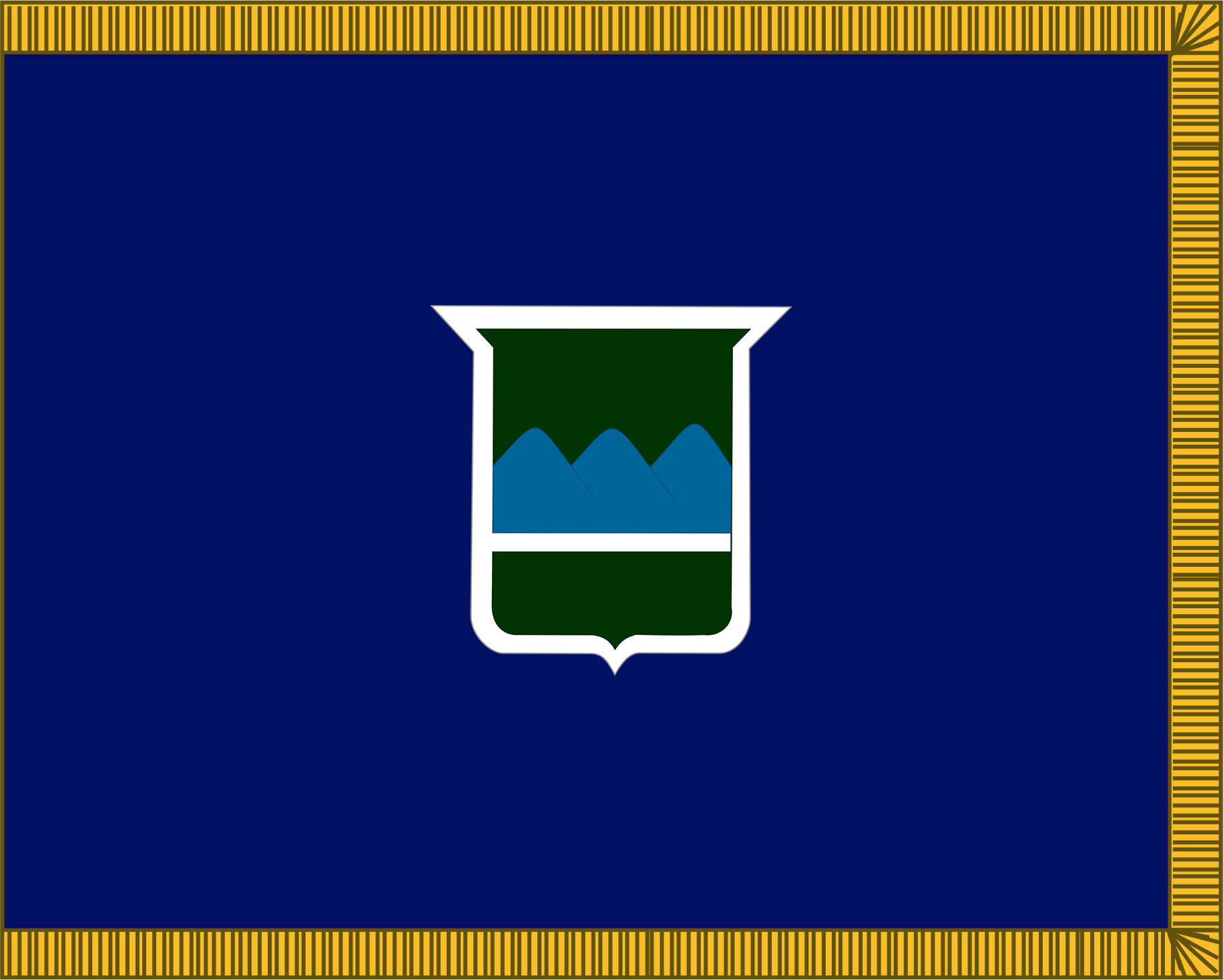
- 80th Training Command Flag

The 80th Training Command (The Army School System – TASS) is a formation of the United States Army Reserve.

The unit was first organized in August 1917 and activated the following September during World War I as the 80th Division. During World War II, the Division was redesignated on 1 August 1942, as the 80th Infantry Division. Nicknamed the "Blue Ridge Division", it was initially composed of draftees from the mid-Atlantic states of Maryland, Pennsylvania, Virginia, and West Virginia. The Division was redesignated the 80th Airborne Division from December 1946 to May 1952. In May 1952 and March 1959, the unit was redesignated as a reserve infantry division and then a reserve training division. In 1994, it became the 80th Division (Institutional Training). On 1 October 2008, the division was reorganised as the 80th Training Command.

== History ==
=== World War I ===
- Activated: September 1917
- Overseas: June 1918
- Major operations: Battle of the Somme (1918), Meuse-Argonne, Battle of Saint-Mihiel.
- Casualties: Total-6,029. (KIA-880; WIA-5,149).
- Commanders: Brig. Gen. Herman Hall (ad interim, 27 August 1917), Maj. Gen. Adelbert Cronkhite (9 September 1917), Brig. Gen. Loyd M. Brett (ad interim, 26 November 1917), Brig. Gen. Wilds P. Richardson (ad interim, 28 December 1917), Brig. Gen. Charles S. Farnsworth (ad interim, 7 January 1918), Brig. Gen. Loyd M. Brett (ad interim, 14 January 1918), Maj. Gen. Adelbert Cronkhite (1 March 1918), Maj. Gen. Samuel D. Sturgis (22 November 1918), Maj. Gen. Adelbert Cronkhite (12 April 1919)
- Inactivated: May 1919.

On 5 August 1917, the War Department directed the organization of the 80th Division at Camp Lee, Virginia. The division's units were intended to be made up of draftees from Pennsylvania, Virginia and West Virginia.

There is still a standing memorial representing the men and women who put their lives on the line for their country in the battles throughout France in the Meuse-Argonne. The Pennsylvania Memorial which is located At Place du Grand Four in Nantillois, France pays tribute to the members who did everything they could to end the Germans push during WW1.

The 80th Division at full numbers reached 23,000 trained soldiers who sailed to France. They landed and stationed in France on June 8th, 1918. The 80th Division was utilized in the training of the British Third Army and joined forces on the front line close to the Artois sector, experiencing heavy action in the Somme Offensive of 1918 and the Meuse-Argonne Offensive. The 80th Division showed success in their results in frontline action, and proved to be a reliable Division in the eyes of British and French soldiers.

==== Order of battle ====
- Headquarters, 80th Division
- 159th Infantry Brigade
  - 317th Infantry Regiment
  - 318th Infantry Regiment
  - 313th Machine Gun Battalion
- 160th Infantry Brigade
  - 319th Infantry Regiment
  - 320th Infantry Regiment
  - 315th Machine Gun Battalion
- 155th Field Artillery Brigade
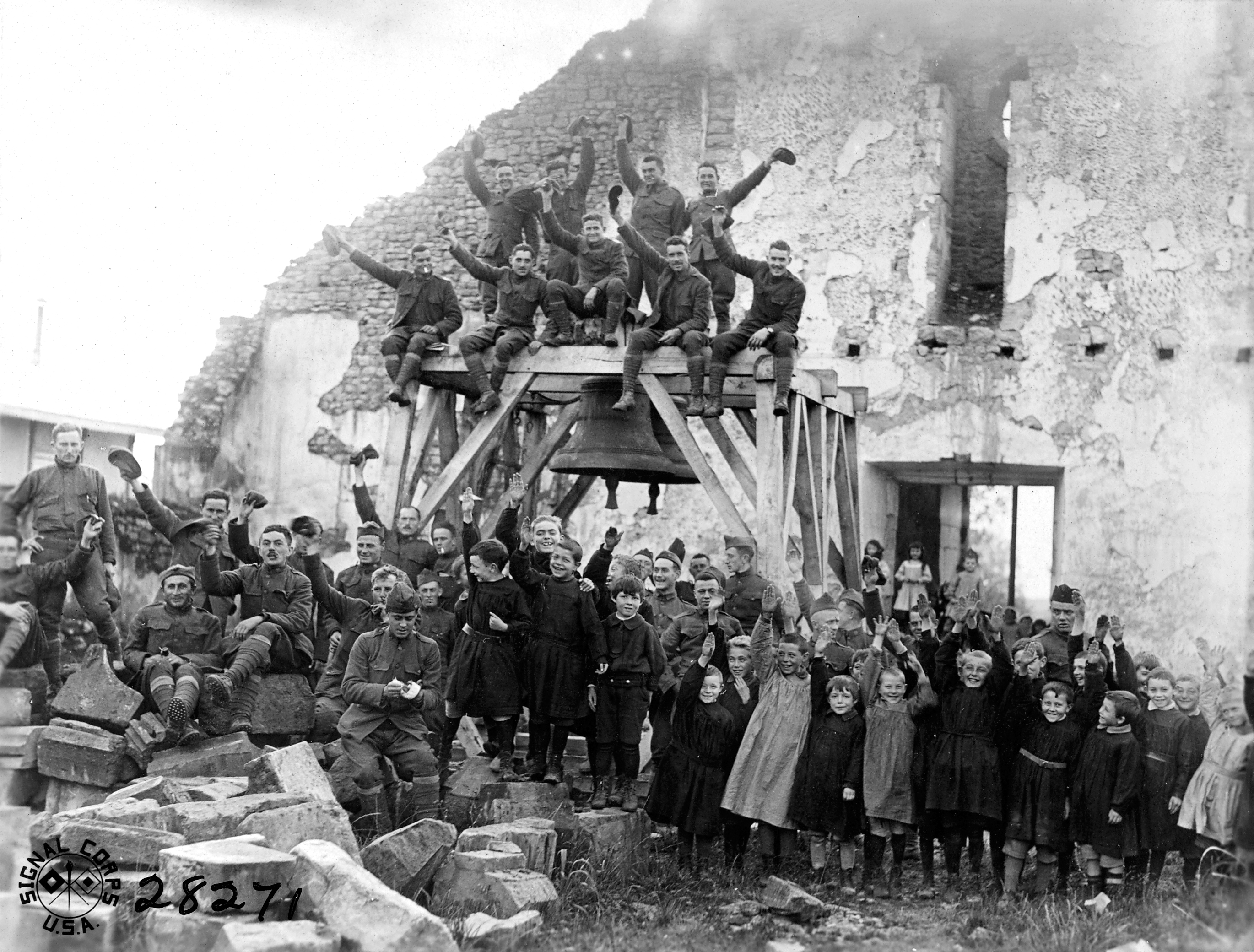
  - Members of the 305th Field Signal Battalion, 80th Division, with children of the village of Vaubecourt, Meuse, France (21 October 1918)
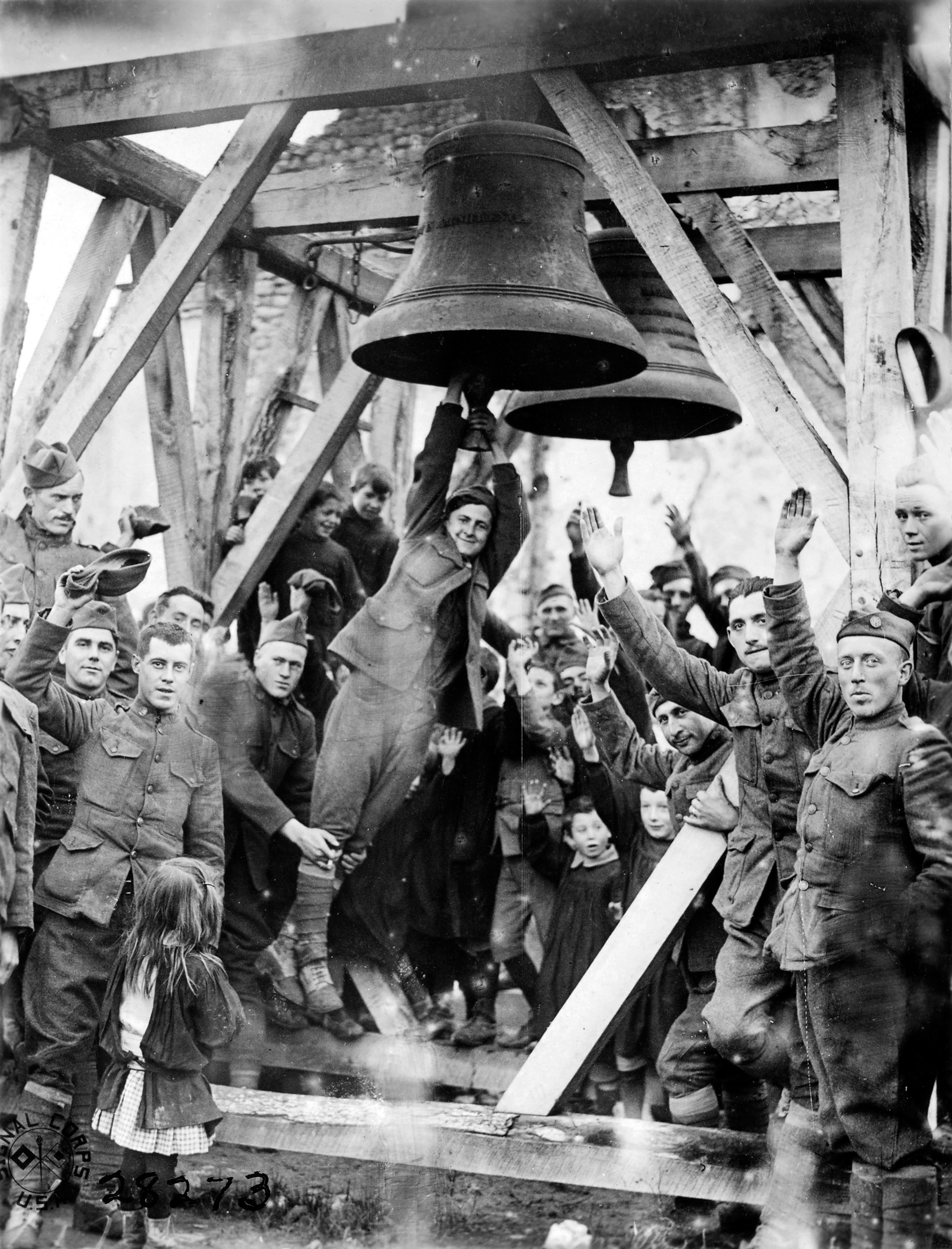
    Private J. R. Fletcher, 80th Division, and children of Vaubecourt ring church bells that had been blown from the belfry by Germans forces in 1914 on their retreat from the town (21 October 1918)
    313th Field Artillery Regiment (75 mm)
  - 314th Field Artillery Regiment (75 mm)
  - 315th Field Artillery Regiment (155 mm)
  - 305th Trench Mortar Battery
- 314th Machine Gun Battalion
- 305th Engineer Regiment
- 305th Field Signal Battalion
- Headquarters Troop, 80th Division
- 305th Train Headquarters and Military Police
  - 305th Ammunition Train
  - 305th Supply Train
  - 305th Engineer Train
  - 305th Sanitary Train
    - 317th, 318th, 319th, and 320th Ambulance Companies and Field Hospitals

The 317th Infantry included men from central and western Virginia; the 318th Infantry was made up mostly of men from the Shenandoah Valley and Tidewater areas; the 313th Machine Gun Battalion mostly had men from the Erie, Pennsylvania, area. These units comprised the 159th Infantry Brigade. The 318th Infantry were nicknamed the "squirrels" while training with the British in the Artois/Picardy section of France; the 1st Battalion was the "red squirrels," the 2nd Battalion was the "gray squirrels," and the 3rd Battalion was the "flying squirrels."

The 319th Infantry included men from the Allegheny County and Erie areas, and a few from eastern Ohio. The 320th Infantry had men from Pittsburgh; the 315th Machine Gun Battalion had men from Pittsburgh and Erie. These units combined to create the 160th Infantry Brigade.

Each infantry regiment in the 80th Division used a unique helmet marking; the 317th used a diamond, the 318th a square, the 319th a circle, and the 320th Infantry Regiment a bowl shape. The headquarters of each regiment divided their shape using three vertical stripes of red, white, and blue; the 1st battalion of each regiment used solid red, the 2nd battalion white, and the 3rd battalion blue. Each company painted their respective letter inside the shape. The machine gun company of each regiment divided their shape vertically in half in red and blue; the supply company divided their shape in red and white.

The 313th, 314th and 315th Field Artillery Regiments were composed of men almost exclusively from the state of West Virginia, and formed the 155th Field Artillery Brigade.

Serving with the division were the 314th Machine Gun Battalion (men from the Tidewater area) as well as the 305th Engineer Regiment (men from the area east and north of Pittsburgh); the 305th Trains (Ammunition, Engineer, Supply and Sanitary) were men from western Pennsylvania, West Virginia and Virginia. The engineers were more often than not sent out ahead. During the rest period from 14 October through the Armistice, they finally were outfitted with U.S. Springfield and Browning automatic rifles. They had two weeks to train before the third and final push began in the Meuse-Argonne. It was also during this period that an attack formation was reorganized to allow for more maneuverability.

==== Meuse-Argonne ====
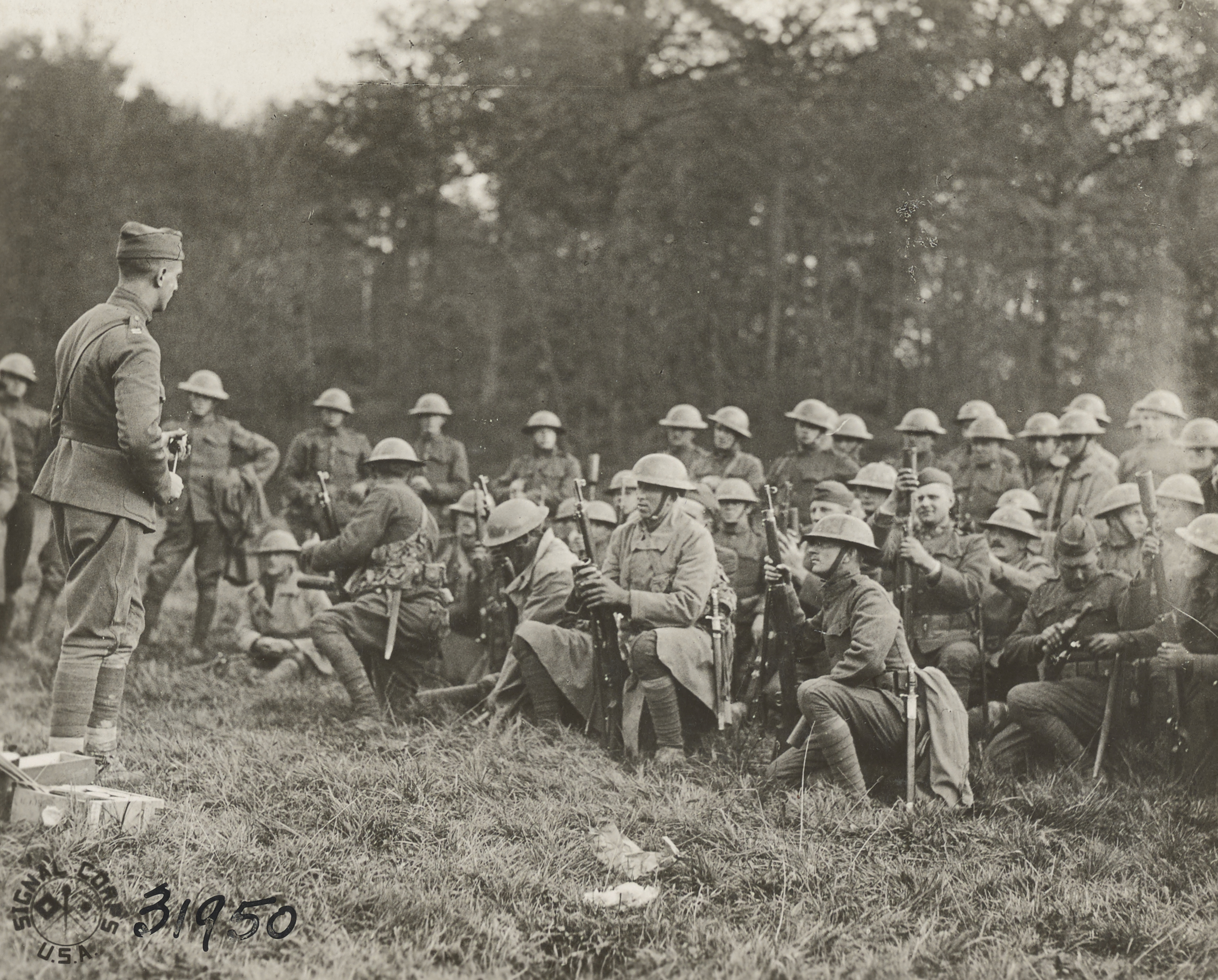
Doughboys of the 2nd Battalion, 318th Infantry, being shown the new phosphorus hand and rifle grenade No.27, Le Neufour, Meuse, France, 26 October 1918.

The 155th Field Artillery Regiment was in combat from the start of the Meuse Argonne, continuously with the 80th Division, but served also with the 90th Division into Germany, until after the Armistice. Altogether, the 155th served with five different divisions.

During the Meuse Argonne campaign, the 80th Division was the only one that saw action during each phase of the offensive (three times). And they first earned their motto, "The 80th Division Moves only Forward!". The artillery of the division boasted more days of continuous combat firing than the batteries of any other American division. The 80th captured two Germans and one machine gun for every man wounded and one piece of artillery with gun crew for every 10 men wounded. Men of the 80th Division received 619 awards and decorations.

==== Division insignia ====
"Previously announced, the distinctive symbols of the various units of the Division were declared official on 30 April 1918. For the four Infantry Regiments, in their order beginning with the 317th Infantry, they were a diamond, square, circle, and semi circle. The symbol of each unit's Headquarters Company was colored red, white and blue; that of the Supply Company red and white; that of the Machine Gun Company red and blue. The battalion symbols were colored in red (Coys, A, B, C, D), white (Coys, E, F, G, H), blue (Coys, I, K, L, M) in numerical order. The three Machine Gun battalions were identified with a shield – blue and white (313th), red and white (314th), red and blue (315th), in order, beginning with the 313th M.G.Bn. Other Units of the Command were assigned equally distinctive symbols, thereby enabling property and individuals immediately identified by the markings required on the packing cases, wagons, helmets and other property articles".

All artillery units wear the "Gun Sight" on their helmets. It referenced the 313th F.A. and 314th F.A. with two blocks at approximately 45 degrees and 270 degrees. The 315th F.A. was 155mm and their "Gun Sight" emblem was a variation of this emblem. It contained the infantry colors (blue) in the four quadrants. In the center, there was a star and the battery letter was in the center of the star. The engineer units were identified by spades on their helmets. White and red for the headquarters company, red for the 1st Battalion (Companies A,B,C), white for the 2nd Battalion (Companies D, E, F).

=== Interwar period ===
The 80th Division headquarters arrived at the port of Newport News, Virginia, aboard the USS Zeppelin on 28 May 1919 after 12 months of overseas service and was demobilized on 5 June 1919 at Camp Lee, Virginia. It was reconstituted in the Organized Reserve on 24 June 1921, allotted to the Third Corps Area, and assigned to the XIII Corps. The division was further allotted to the states of Virginia, Maryland, and Washington, D.C. The division headquarters was organized on 1 September 1921 at 1014 East Main Street in Richmond, Virginia. It was relocated in 1926 to the Post Office Building, moved in 1933 to the Broad-Grace Arcade Building at Third and Grace Streets, and finally to the Parcel Post Building in 1935. The headquarters remained there until activated for World War II.

The designated mobilization and training station for the division was Camp George G. Meade, Maryland, the location where much of the 80th's training activities occurred in the interwar years. The division headquarters usually conducted its summer training there, and on a number of occasions, participated in command post exercises. The 80th Division headquarters occasionally trained with the staff of the 8th Division's 16th Infantry Brigade. The subordinate infantry regiments of the division held their summer training primarily with the units of the 16th Infantry Brigade. Other units, such as the special troops, artillery, engineers, aviation, medical, and quartermaster, trained at various posts in the Second and Third Corps Areas usually with units of the 1st Division or the active elements of the 8th Division. For example, the division's artillery trained with the 16th Field Artillery Regiment at Camp Meade; the 305th Engineer Regiment usually trained with the 1st Engineer Regiment at Fort DuPont, Delaware, or the 13th Engineers at Camp Humphreys, Virginia; the 305th Medical Regiment trained with the 1st Medical Regiment at Carlisle Barracks, Pennsylvania; and the 305th Observation Squadron trained with the 99th Observation Squadron at Bolling Field, Washington, D.C. In addition to the unit training camps, the infantry regiments of the division rotated responsibility to conduct the Citizens Military Training Camps held at Camp Meade each year.

On a number of occasions, the division participated in Third Corps Area or First Army command post exercises in conjunction with other Regular Army, National Guard, and Organized Reserve units. Unlike the Regular and Guard units in the Third Corps Area, the 80th Division did not participate in the Third Corps Area maneuvers and the First Army maneuvers of 1935, 1939, and 1940 as an organized unit due to lack of enlisted personnel and equipment. Instead, the officers and a few enlisted reservists were assigned to Regular and Guard units to fill vacant slots and bring the units up to war strength for the exercises. Additionally, some officers were assigned duties as umpires or support personnel.

=== World War II ===
General George Patton visits the US 80th Division on 3 November 1944

- Ordered into active military service: 15 July 1942; Initially, soldiers reported to Camp Forrest, Tennessee, named for General Nathan Bedford Forrest, a Confederate Cavalry commander in the Civil War. The Division later moved for training at Camp Phillips, near Salina, Kansas and at Camp Iron Mountain and Camp Laguna at the Desert Training Center in the California – Arizona Maneuver Area (DTC / C-AMA). The 80th Division, as part of MG Alexander M. Patch Jr.'s IV Corps, were stationed at Camp Laguna, AZ about 25 miles North of Yuma AZ. The 80th remained at the DTC / C-AMA from December 1943 to March 1944.
- Overseas: 1 July 1944
- Campaigns: Northern France, Rhineland, Ardennes-Alsace, Central Europe
- Days of combat: 239
- Distinguished Unit Citations: 6
- Awards: Medal of Honor-4; Distinguished Service Cross (United States)-34; Distinguished Service Medal (United States)-1; Silver Star-771; LM-12; DFC-5; SM-35; BSM-3,869, AM-123.
- Commanders: Maj. Gen. Joseph D. Patch (July 1942 – March 1943), Maj. Gen. Horace L. McBride (March 1943 – October 1945), Maj. Gen. Walter E. Lauer (October 1945 – December 1945).
- Returned to U.S.: 3 January 1946.
- Inactivated: 5 January 1946.

==== Mobilization ====
Before Organized Reserve infantry divisions were ordered into active military service, they were reorganized on paper as "triangular" divisions under the 1940 tables of organization. The headquarters companies of the two infantry brigades were consolidated into the division's cavalry reconnaissance troop, and one infantry regiment was removed by inactivation. The field artillery brigade headquarters and headquarters battery became the headquarters and headquarters battery of the division artillery. Its three field artillery regiments were reorganized into four battalions; one battalion was taken from each of the two 75 mm gun regiments to form two 105 mm howitzer battalions, the brigade's ammunition train was reorganized as the third 105 mm howitzer battalion, and the 155 mm howitzer battalion was formed from the 155 mm howitzer regiment. The engineer, medical, and quartermaster regiments were reorganized into battalions. In 1942, divisional quartermaster battalions were split into ordnance light maintenance companies and quartermaster companies, and the division's headquarters and military police company, which had previously been a combined unit, was split.

==== Division organization ====
The division consisted of the following units:

80th Infantry Division organization (click to enlarge)

- 80th Infantry Division
  - 80th Infantry Division Headquarters
  - 80th Cavalry Reconnaissance Troop (Mechanized) (M3 scout cars and then M8 Greyhound armored cars)
  - 317th Infantry Regiment
    - Headquarters and Headquarters Company
    - 3× Infantry battalions
      - each battalion consists of: 1× Headquarters and Headquarters Company, 3× Rifle companies, 1× Heavy Weapons Company
    - Cannon Company (T12 Gun Motor Carriages and T19 Howitzer Motor Carriages, later replaced by either M3 105mm towed howitzers or M7 Priest self propelled howitzers)
    - Anti-Tank Company (M3 37mm anti-tank guns, which were replaced by 1944 with M1 57mm anti-tank guns)
    - Service Company
  - 318th Infantry Regiment
    - same organization as 317th Infantry Regiment
  - 319th Infantry Regiment
    - same organization as 317th Infantry Regiment
  - 80th Infantry Division Artillery
    - Headquarters and Headquarters Battery
    - 313th Field Artillery Battalion
      - Headquarters and Headquarters Battery
      - 3× Batteries (M2 105mm towed howitzers)
      - Service Battery
    - 314th Field Artillery Battalion
      - same organization as 313th Field Artillery Battalion
    - 315th Field Artillery Battalion
      - Headquarters and Headquarters Battery
      - 3× Batteries (M1 155mm towed howitzers)
      - Service Battery
    - 905th Field Artillery Battalion
      - same organization as 313th Field Artillery Battalion
  - Headquarters Special Troops
    - Headquarters Company, 80th Infantry Division
    - 80th Signal Company
    - 80th Quartermaster Company
    - 780th Ordnance Light Maintenance Company
    - Military Police Platoon
    - 80th Infantry Division Band (attached)
  - 305th Engineer Combat Battalion
    - Headquarters and Headquarters and Service Company
    - 3× Engineer combat companies
  - 305th Medical Battalion
    - Headquarters and Headquarters Detachment
    - 3× Collecting companies
    - Clearing Company

Attached to the division:

- 702nd Tank Battalion

==== Combat chronicle ====
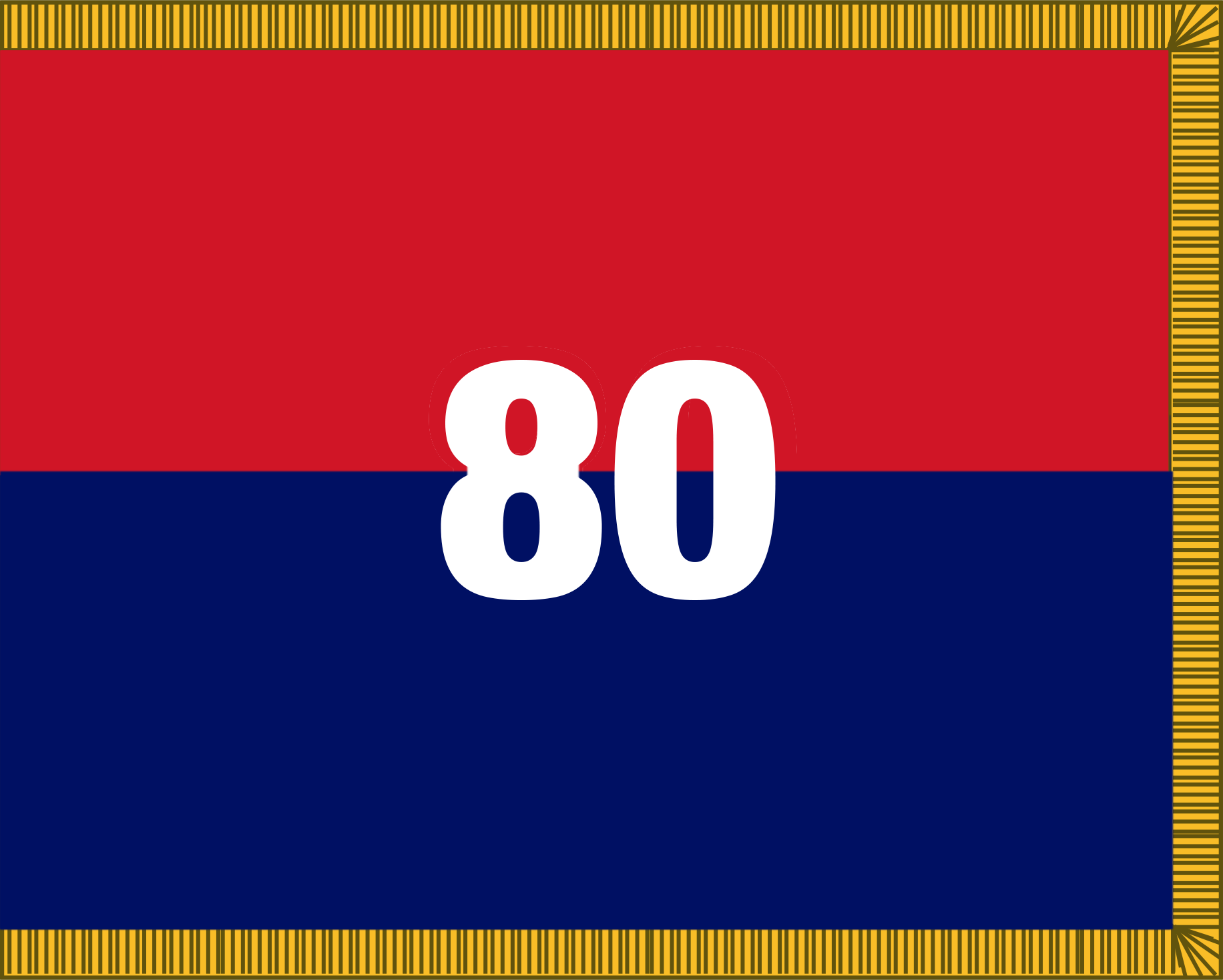
WWII Era 80th Infantry Division Flag

On 5 August 1944, the 80th landed at Utah Beach. The division was destined to become the "work horse" of General Patton's Third Army and to play a key role in the breakthrough at Avranches. The Division then attacked Argentan, taking it, 20 August, and creating the Falaise Pocket. After mopping up in the area, the 80th took part in the Third Army dash across France, cutting through Saint-Mihiel, Châlons, and Commercy in pursuit of the retreating Germans until stopped by the lack of gasoline and other supplies at the river Seille.

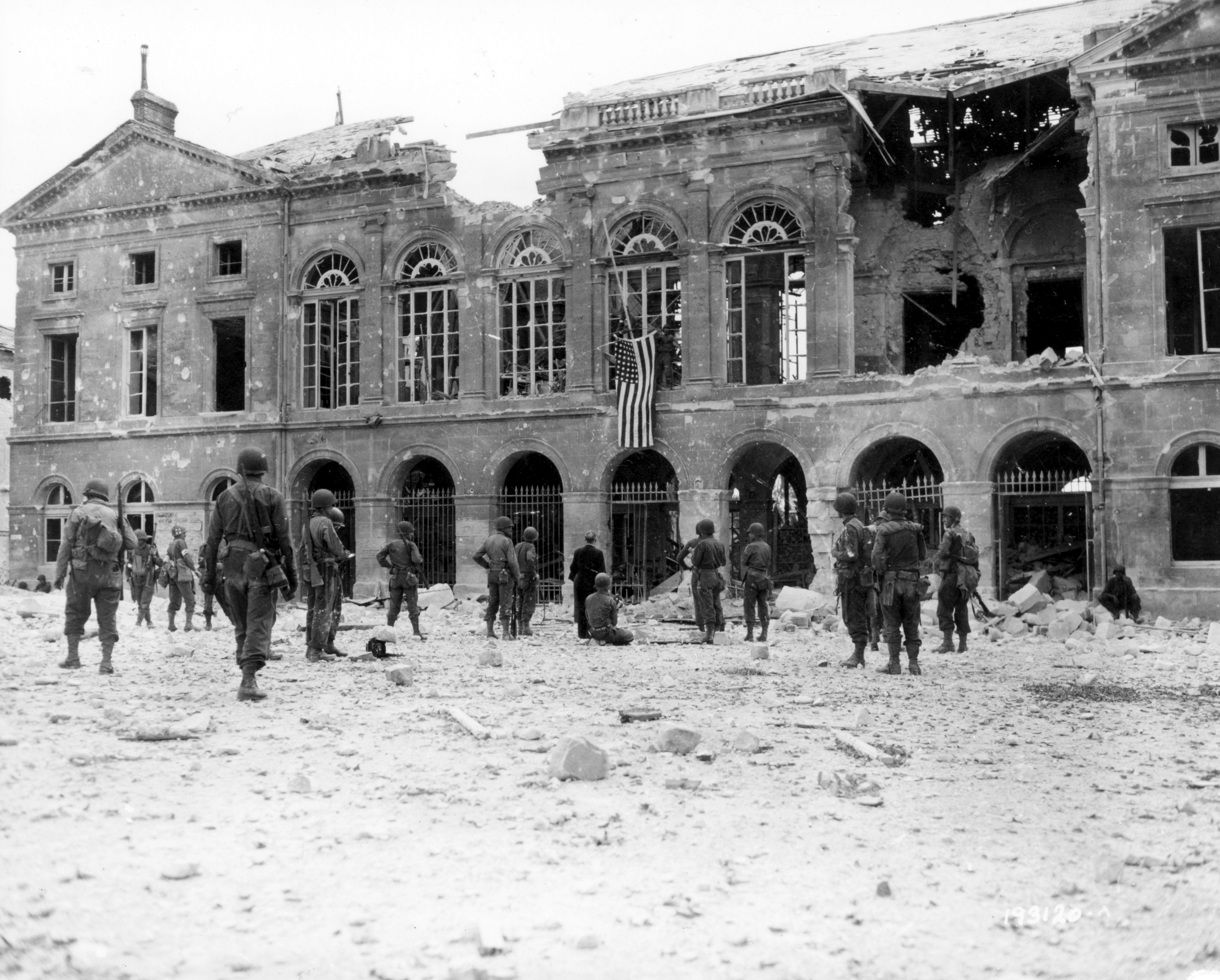
American infantrymen of the 2nd Battalion, 318th Infantry Regiment, 80th Division, look at the American flag flying from the damaged front of the town hall in the French town of Argentan, August 20, 1944.

From 25 September to 7 November, the division maintained an aggressive defense of positions west of the Seille, and prepared for the Third Army sweep into the industrially vital Saar Basin. The attack jumped off on 8 November, the 80th advancing through Delme Ridge, Faulquemont, and St. Avold to within 5 miles (8.0 km) of Saarbrücken, when it was relieved by the 6th Armored Division, 7 December 1944.

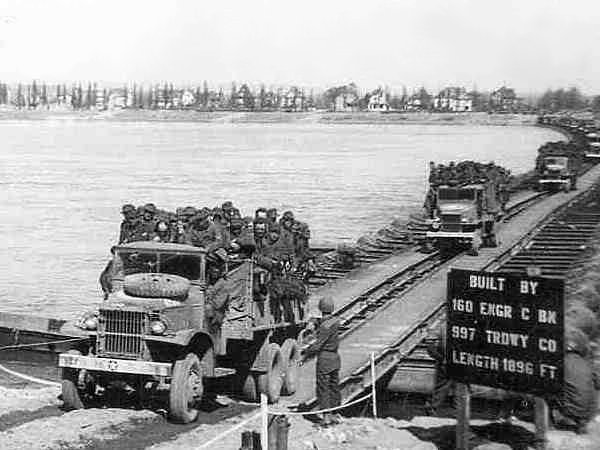
80th crossing the Rhine near Mainz

After 10 days rest, the division returned to combat, moving southeast to take part in an attack on the Siegfried Line at Zweibrücken when the Germans launched their winter offensive in the Ardennes. The 80th was moved northward to Luxembourg and was hurled against the German salient, fighting at Luxembourg and Bastogne. By Christmas Day, men of the 80th were side by side with the tanks of the 4th Armored Division, battering forward through murderous opposition to help the 101st Airborne Division, besieged in Bastogne. Over frozen, snow-covered terrain, the attack gained nine bitter miles despite constant machine gun and mortar fire. The next day, the gap between the rescuers and the besieged was narrowed to 4000 yards. On 28 December, the 80th broke through, bringing relief to the 101st before driving the enemy across the Sure to Dahl and Goesdorf, 7 January 1945, and across the Clerf and Wiltz Rivers by 23 January. On 7 February 1945, the division stormed across the Our and Sauer Rivers at Wallendorf (Eifel), broke through the Siegfried Line, pursued the fleeing enemy to Kaiserslautern, 20 March, and crossed the Rhine, 27–28 March, near Mainz.

Pursuit continued in April, the division defeating the German defenders at Kassel, driving rapidly to Erfurt on the 12th, and Weimar, Jena, and Gera on the 14th. Relieved, 21 April, it moved to Nürnberg for occupation duty and on 28 April, to Regensburg, then to the Enns River, battling to the very end. It has been alleged that the last shot fired on the western front was in Czechoslovakia by the 80th, the last of General Patton's divisions still in action. General Patton issued his cease-fire order at 0800 on 8 May 1945. By V-E day, the 80th Division had amassed 289 days of combat and had captured more than 200,000 enemy soldiers.

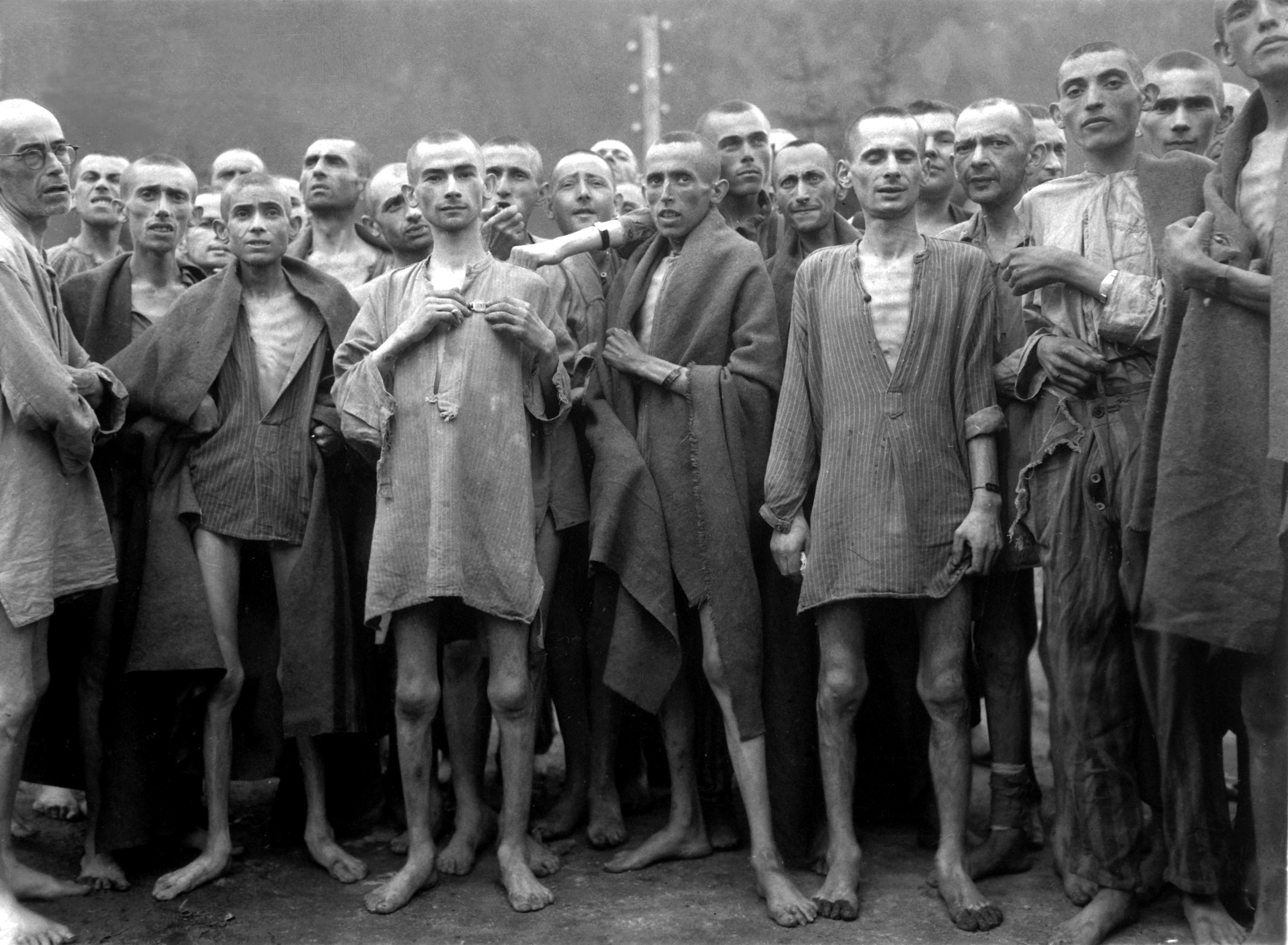
Prisoners of Ebensee, one of the sub-camps of Mauthausen-Gusen, upon liberation by 80th Division

==== Casualties ====
- Total battle casualties: 17,087
- Killed in action: 3,038
- Wounded in action: 12,484
- Missing in action: 488
- Prisoner of war: 1,077

==== Assignments in ETO ====
- 1 August 1944: XII Corps, Third Army, 12th Army Group.
- 7 August 1944: XX Corps
- 8 August 1944: XV Corps.
- 10 August 1944: XX Corps.
- 17 August 1944: Third Army, 12th Army Group, but attached to the V Corps, First Army, 12th Army Group.
- 28 August 1944: Third Army, 12th Army Group.
- 26 August 1944: XII Corps.
- 19 December 1944: III Corps.
- 26 December 1944: XII Corps.
- 10 March 1945: XX Corps.

=== Cold War ===
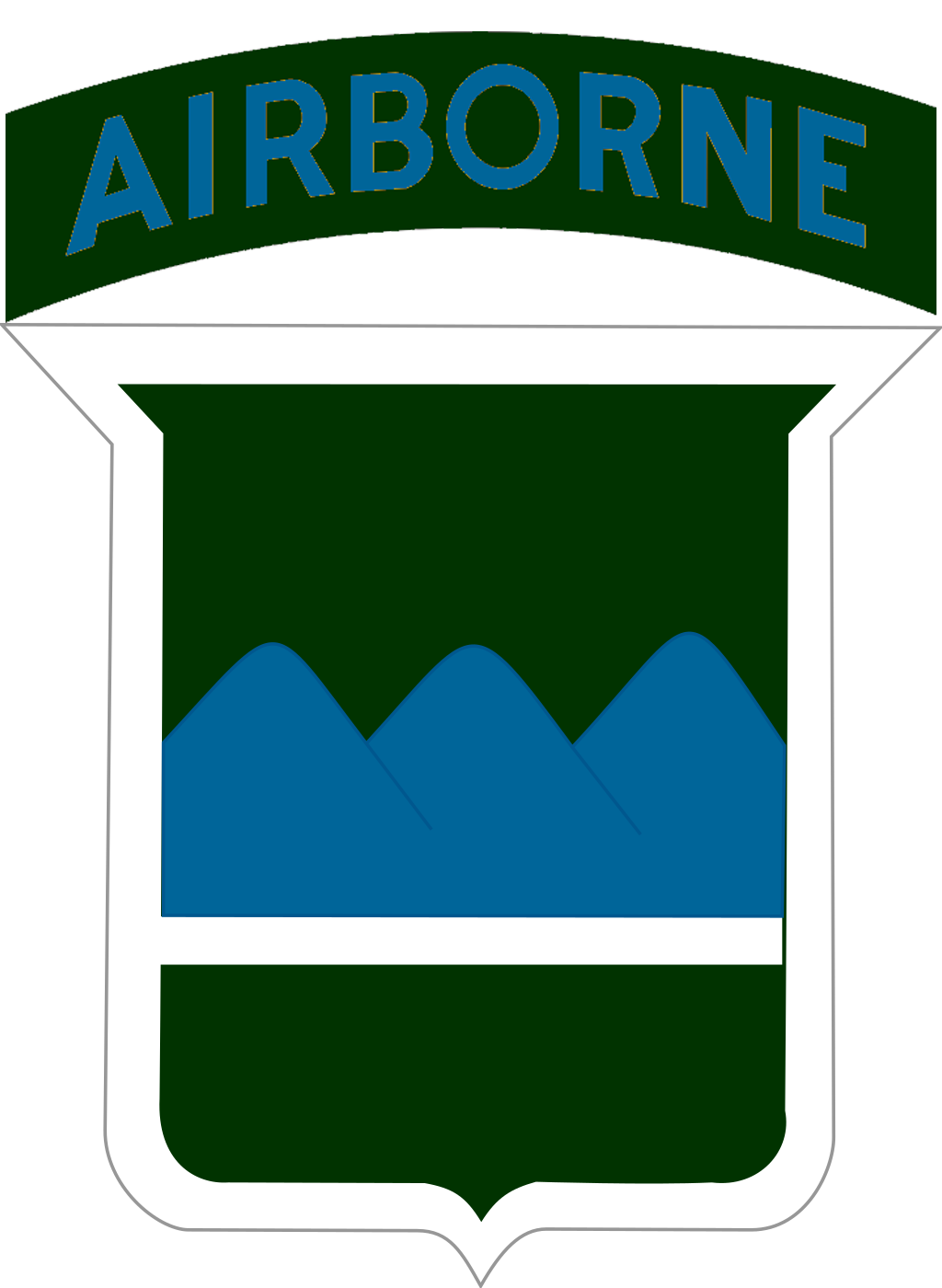
80th Airborne Division SSI

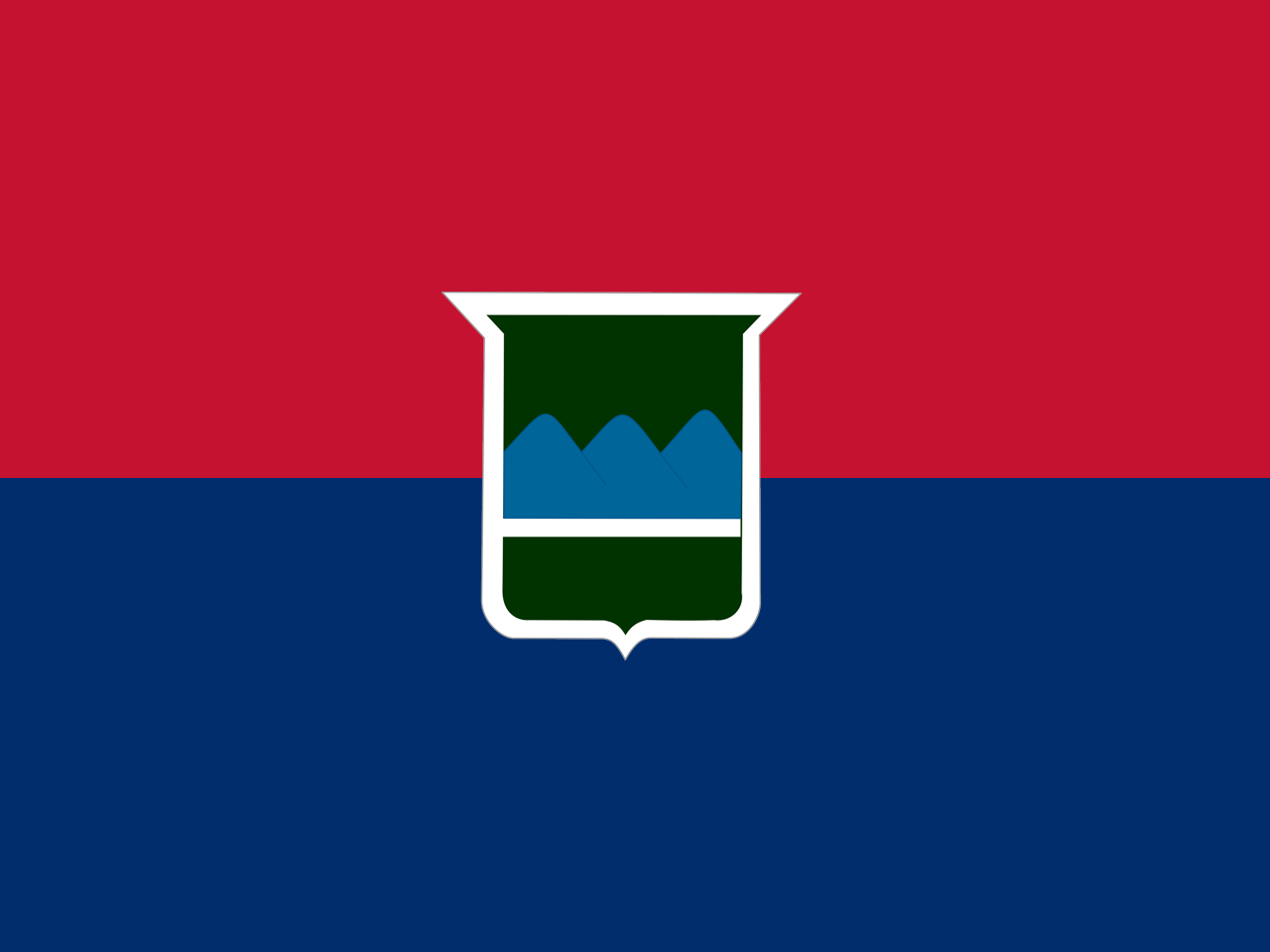
80th Infantry Division Flag

The division was inactivated in January 1946, but reactivated in December of that year as the 80th Airborne Division. Since then, the division has been reorganized several times. As an airborne division, it became one of 24 organized Reserve Corps divisions. In 1952, during the Korean War, it was reorganized again as the 80th Infantry Division and remained as such for seven years. In March 1959, it was reorganized as the 80th Division (Training), with a primary focus of providing initial entry training to trainees at Fort Bragg, North Carolina, and Fort Jackson, South Carolina, a mission and structure that lasted for many years. In 1988 and 1990, the division carried out ten-week exercises for wartime mobilization missions named, "Old Dominion Forward" at Fort Bragg, setting up training for nearly 700 new Soldiers.

=== Gulf War ===
Units from the 80th Division were activated in support of Operations Desert Shield and Desert Storm. Two 80th Division units were called to active duty in support of Operation Desert Shield/Storm. The 424th Transportation Company of Galax, Virginia, was activated 17 November 1990. After training and equipping at Fort Eustis, Virginia, it deployed to Saudi Arabia 5 January 1991. For its service in the war the company was awarded a Meritorious Unit Commendation. Citation reading: "... under adverse conditions in a combat zone, logging over 850,000 accident- free road miles, in the countries of Saudi Arabia, Kuwait and Iraq." By the end of the war, elements of the 424th had advanced as far as the Euphrates River in support of coalition assault units. The 424th returned to the United States on 29–30 June 1991, and to home station 3 July. Soldiers of the 3rd Battalion, 318th Regiment, 4th Brigade, at Fort Story, Virginia, were activated 23 January 1991, and reported to Fort Eustis to train recalled reservists. Because of the short duration of the ground war in Iraq and Kuwait, additional Individual Ready Reserve troops were not called up and the 3rd Battalion was released from active duty and returned to home station 17 March.

=== New organization ===
In 1992, the division began a training base expansion mission at Fort Benning, Georgia. The mission changed to professional roundout training at Fort Jackson, South Carolina, the following year when Reservists worked with active duty Army drill sergeants in training new soldiers. October 1994 marked the fourth major reorganization since World War II, when it became Headquarters, 80th Division (Training). Maintaining the Initial Entry mission, it expanded to provide "The Army School System" or TASS mission. The 80th took command and control of 10 Army Reserve Forces schools, and along with legacy divisions from World War II (84th, 95th, 98th, 100th, 104th, and the 108th) became one of seven institutional training (IT) divisions, located in seven regions throughout the U.S. The 80th Division (IT) provided instructions for units in Region B which included Virginia, West Virginia, Pennsylvania, Maryland, the District of Columbia, and Delaware. Seven brigades of the 80th Division (IT) carried out specific training missions in the above states and proceeded to Fort Leonard Wood, Missouri, to support expansion of the U.S. Army Training Center and to conduct Basic Combat Training (BCT), One Station Unit Training (OSUT) and other specialized training, as directed by Training and Doctrine Command (TRADOC).

=== Afghanistan and Iraq ===
- Operation Noble Eagle After 11 September 2001, specialized training commenced with drill sergeant and instructor units mobilized to training posts in the U.S.
- Operation Enduring Freedom in 2004, 80th Division (IT) units provided training and reconstruction support to the Afghanistan government.
- Operation Iraqi Freedom in 2005 in support, the 80th Division (IT) mobilized and deployed to Iraq in support of the largest activation of the division's soldiers since World War II, serving in every specialty and skill as a part of the Multi-National Security Transition Command+–+Iraq. Two soldiers were killed in action and two others died stateside while mobilized during this conflict.

During the period 17 May 2005 to 15 August 2006, 80th Division (Institutional Training) displayed outstanding meritorious service in support of Operation Iraqi Freedom. The unit planned and executed the largest mobilization and combat-zone deployment of the Army Reserve Division since 1945. Additionally, the unit was responsible for training and advising over 106,000 Iraqi Army Soldiers to include: two Iraqi Army Division Headquarters, seven Iraqi Brigade Headquarters, and twenty-two Battalions of Iraqi Soldiers.

So far 80th Division soldiers have earned more than 1,144 medals and citations including 31 Purple Hearts, 2 Bronze Stars with Combat V, 467 Bronze Stars, 84 Combat Infantryman Badges (CIB) and 187 Combat Action Badges (CAB). The unit continues to support the Global War on Terrorism with individual and group deployments to the theater of operations as required.

== 80th Training Command ==
On 1 October 2008, the 80th Division (IT) transformed to become the 80th Training Command (TASS). It expanded from the five states to reach across the entire country. Of the seven IT divisions, only three remain, with the 80th taking command of the entire TASS mission for the Army Reserve. The 80th expanded from eight brigades and 12 battalions to three divisions (94th, 100th, 102nd), 13 brigades, 63 battalions, and 14 training centers. The 80th is the third-largest command organization in the U.S. Army Reserve. Made up of over 7,300 Army Reserve Soldiers assigned to 15 brigade units aligned under three major subordinate one-star commands with units located nationwide—from Pennsylvania to Puerto Rico and from the Carolinas and Georgia to California. It has an operational control training relationship with a unit in Hawaii and a support relationship with a unit in Germany.

The command's annual economic impact is about $40–60 million. In addition to the salaries of full-time civilian and military personnel, this figure also includes pay to Army Reserve soldiers, money spent locally for the purchase of supplies, services, maintenance support, equipment, facility construction and renovation, and the G.I. Bill college tuition payments to Army Reserve soldiers attending school.

The 80th trains Army soldiers in the career military fields for Combat Support and Combat Service Support. The 94th Training Division (Force Sustainment) headquarters is located at Fort Gregg-Adams, Virginia (Erstwhile Fort Lee) and became fully mission capable in October 2009. The 100th Training Division (Operational Support) has its headquarters in Louisville. Kentucky, and will soon relocate to Fort Knox. The 102nd Training Division (Maneuver Support) headquarters is located at Fort Leonard Wood, Missouri, and also became fully mission capable in October 2009.

The 80th as of 1 October 2026 will take on the is broadening its mission by welcoming the U.S. Army Reserve Drill Sergeants from the deactivated 108th Training Command.

=== Organization ===
The 80th Training Command (The Army School System — TASS) is a subordinate functional command of the United States Army Reserve Command. As of January 2026 the command consists of the following units:

- 80th Training Command (The Army School System — TASS), in Richmond (VA)
  - 94th Training Division (Force Sustainment), at Fort Lee (VA)
    - 1st Brigade (Quartermaster), in Charleston (WV)
    - 2nd Brigade (Transportation), at Fort Lee (VA)
    - 3rd Brigade (Ordnance), in Indianapolis (IN)
    - 4th Brigade (Personnel Services), in Decatur (GA)
    - 5th Brigade (Health Services), at Joint Base San Antonio (TX)
  - 95th Training Division (IET), at Fort Sill (OK)
    - 1st Brigade (IET), at Fort Sill (OK)
      - 1st Battalion, 354th Regiment (MP OSUT), in Tulsa (OK)
      - 2nd Battalion, 354th Regiment (BCT), in Grand Prairie (TX)
      - 1st Battalion, 355th Regiment (BCT), in Round Rock (TX)
      - 2nd Battalion, 377th Regiment (BCT), in Lincoln (NE)
      - 3rd Battalion, 378th Regiment (BCT), in Norman (OK)
      - 2nd Battalion, 379th Regiment (TS), at Fort Sill (OK)
    - 2nd Brigade (BCT), in Vancouver (WA)
      - 2nd Battalion, 413th Regiment (BCT), at March Air Reserve Base (CA)
      - 1st Battalion, 415th Regiment (BCT), in Phoenix (AZ)
      - 3rd Battalion, 415th Regiment (BCT), at Fairchild Air Force Base (WA)
    - 3rd Brigade (IET), in Beaver Dam (WI)
      - 1st Battalion, 320th Regiment (MP OSUT), in Abingdon (VA)
      - 1st Battalion, 330th Regiment (BCT), in Fort Wayne (IN)
      - 2nd Battalion, 330th Regiment (EN OSUT), in Arlington Heights (IL)
      - 1st Battalion, 334th Regiment (TS), in Milwaukee (WI)
      - 3rd Battalion, 334th Regiment (BCT), in Milwaukee (WI)
      - 1st Battalion, 390th Regiment (EN OSUT), in Amherst (NY)
  - 100th Training Division (Operational Support), at Fort Knox (KY)
    - 83rd United States Army Reserve Readiness Training Center — ARRTC, at Fort Knox (KY)
    - 97th Training Brigade (Command and General Staff Officers' Course — CGSOC), in Fort Sheridan (IL)
  - 102nd Training Division (Maneuver Support), at Fort Leonard Wood (MO)
    - 1st Brigade (Engineer), at Fort Leonard Wood (MO)
    - 2nd Brigade (Military Police), at Fort Leonard Wood (MO)
    - 3rd Brigade (Chemical), at Fort Leonard Wood (MO)
    - 4th Brigade (Military Intelligence), at Fort Huachuca (AZ)
    - 5th Brigade (Signal), at Fort Gordon (GA)
    - 6th Brigade (Civil Affairs and Psychological Operations), at Fort Totten (NY)
  - 800th Training Support Brigade, in Mustang (OK)
    - TASS Training Center Camp Parks, at Camp Parks (CA)
    - TASS Training Center Fort Devens, at Fort Devens (MA)
    - TASS Training Center Fort Dix, at Joint Base McGuire–Dix–Lakehurst (NJ)
    - TASS Training Center Fort Hunter Liggett, at Fort Hunter Liggett (CA)
    - TASS Training Center Fort Knox, at Fort Knox (KY)
    - TASS Training Center Fort Lee, at Fort Lee (VA)
    - TASS Training Center Fort Leonard Wood, at Fort Leonard Wood (MO)
    - TASS Training Center Grand Prairie, in Grand Prairie (TX)

== Commanders ==
World War I

- Major General Adelbert Cronkhite
- Brigadier General Lloyd Milton Brett
- Major General Samuel D. Sturgis

World War II

- Major General Walter E. Lauer
- Major General Joseph D. Patch
- Major General Horace L. McBride
- Brigadier General Edmund Wilson Searby

Cold War

- Major General James B. Cress
- Major General William M. Stokes Jr.
- Major General Morgan M. Wallace
- Major General Frederick H. Garber III
- Brigadier General Charles B. Deane
- Major General Willard P. Milby Jr.
- Major General Louis H. Ginn
- Major General John P. Henderson
- Major General John W. Knapp

Persian Gulf War

- Major General Stephen H. Sewell, Jr.

______________

- Major General Max Guggenheimer, Jr.
- Major General James P. Browder, Jr.

Global war on terrorism

- Major General Douglas O. Dollar
- Major General David L. Evans
- Major General John P. McLaren, Jr.
- Major General Bowlman T. Bowles III

== General information ==
- Nickname: Blue Ridge. Thundering Herd
- Slogan: Only moves forward. (Original slogan: Strength of the mountains.)
- Shoulder patch: Whitebordered shield of green upon which are superimposed three azure blue mountain peaks.
