= Joseph D. Patch =

U.S. Army major general

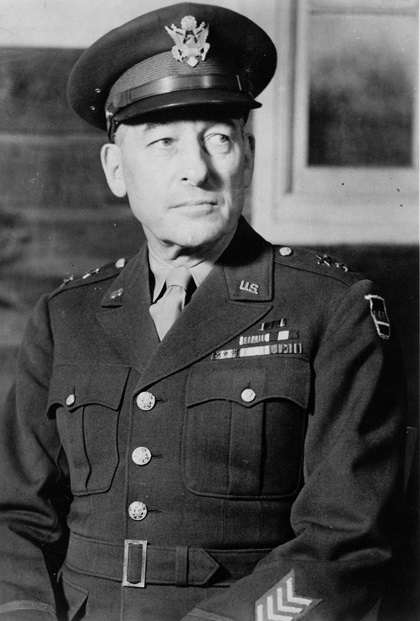
- Patch as commander of the 80th Infantry Division in 1942
- Born: December 8, 1885; Fort Huachuca, Arizona Territory, U.S.
- Died: November 21, 1966 (aged 80); Corpus Christi, Texas, U.S.
- Burial place: Seaside Memorial Park, Corpus Christi, Texas, U.S.
- Alma mater: Carnegie Technical School; United States Army Command and General Staff College; United States Army War College
- Spouse: Minerva King (m. 1916–1966)
- Children: 3
- Relatives: Alexander Patch (brother); William S. Moore (grandfather)
- Military career
- Service: United States Army
- Service years: 1909–1945
- Rank: Major General
- Service number: 03126
- Unit: U.S. Army Infantry Branch
- Commands: 1st Battalion, 18th Infantry Regiment; 1st Battalion, 805th Pioneer Infantry Regiment; Reserve Officers' Training Corps, Lehigh University; Reserve Officers' Training Corps, University of Maryland, College Park; 34th Infantry Regiment; 87th Infantry Brigade, 44th Infantry Division; 80th Infantry Division; Trinidad Sector and Base Command; Army Service Forces Training Center, Fort Lewis
- Wars: Mexican Border War; World War I World War II
- Awards: Distinguished Service Cross; Purple Heart; Croix de guerre (France)

Joseph D. Patch (December 8, 1885 – November 21, 1966) was a career officer in the United States Army. A veteran of the Mexican Border War, World War I and World War II, his awards and decorations included the Distinguished Service Cross. Patch served from 1909 to 1945, and he attained the rank of major general as the Second World War commander of the 80th Infantry Division.

Born at Fort Huachuca and the son of an army officer who later became a railroad executive, Patch was raised primarily in Lebanon, Pennsylvania. He attended St. Luke's School in Wayne, Pennsylvania, and Carnegie Technical School (now Carnegie Mellon University), then worked on construction of the Panama Canal. In 1909 he enlisted in the army, and in 1911 he was commissioned as a second lieutenant. Patch served in Texas during the Mexican Border War. During World War I, he served in combat in France, during which he was wounded and received the Distinguished Service Cross and French Croix de guerre for heroism, as well as the Purple Heart.

After the First World War, Patch advanced through the ranks in command and staff positions including professor of military science at Lehigh University and the University of Maryland, College Park. He was a 1925 graduate of the United States Army Command and General Staff College and a 1935 graduate of the United States Army War College. During the Second World War, he commanded: 87th Infantry Brigade, 44th Infantry Division; 80th Infantry Division; Trinidad Sector and Base Command; and Army Service Forces Training Center, Fort Lewis. He retired from the army in 1945.

In retirement, patch resided in Corpus Christi, Texas and was an author of military history books. He died in Corpus Christi on November 21, 1966. Patch was buried at Seaside Memorial Park in Corpus Christi.

== Early life ==
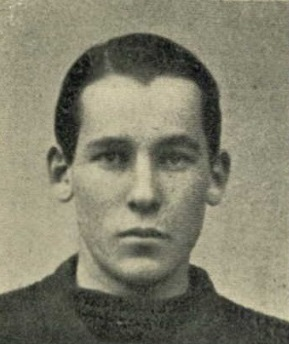
Patch as a student at St. Luke's School

Joseph Dorst Patch was born at Fort Huachuca, Arizona Territory on December 8, 1885, a son of army Captain Alexander McCarrell Patch Sr. and Annie Brownlee (Moore) Patch. (Note: Among family and friends, Patch was usually known as "Dorst".) Patch's mother was the daughter of William S. Moore, the U.S. congressman who appointed his father to the United States Military Academy. Patch's father became a railroad executive after his military service, and Patch was raised and educated in Lebanon, Pennsylvania. His siblings included twin sister Elizabeth (Elsie), who died before her second birthday, and brother William, the drama critic for the Pittsburgh Dispatch and later the manager of a Pittsburgh theater company. Sister Lida was the wife of army officer Philip Gordon. Brother Alexander Patch was a career officer who attained the rank of lieutenant general during World War II and was posthumously promoted to general.

In 1902, Patch received an alternate appointment to the United States Military Academy (West Point). He performed well on the 1903 examination, but the principal appointees began attendance at West Point on schedule, so Patch did not become a West Point student. Patch later attended St. Luke's School in Wayne, Pennsylvania. While at St. Luke's, he was captain of the football team and president of his senior class. From 1906 to 1908, he was a student at the Carnegie Technical School (now Carnegie Mellon University). In 1908, he took a civil engineering position in Panama during construction of the Panama Canal. In June 1909, he enlisted as a private in the United States Army and was assigned to the 9th Infantry Regiment, first at Fort Sam Houston, Texas and later in the Philippines. By April 1911, Patch was a corporal in the regiment's Company D and he was among several 9th Infantry soldiers selected to take the competitive examination for an officer's commission. He attained a passing score, and in August he received appointment as a second lieutenant of Infantry.

== Start of career ==
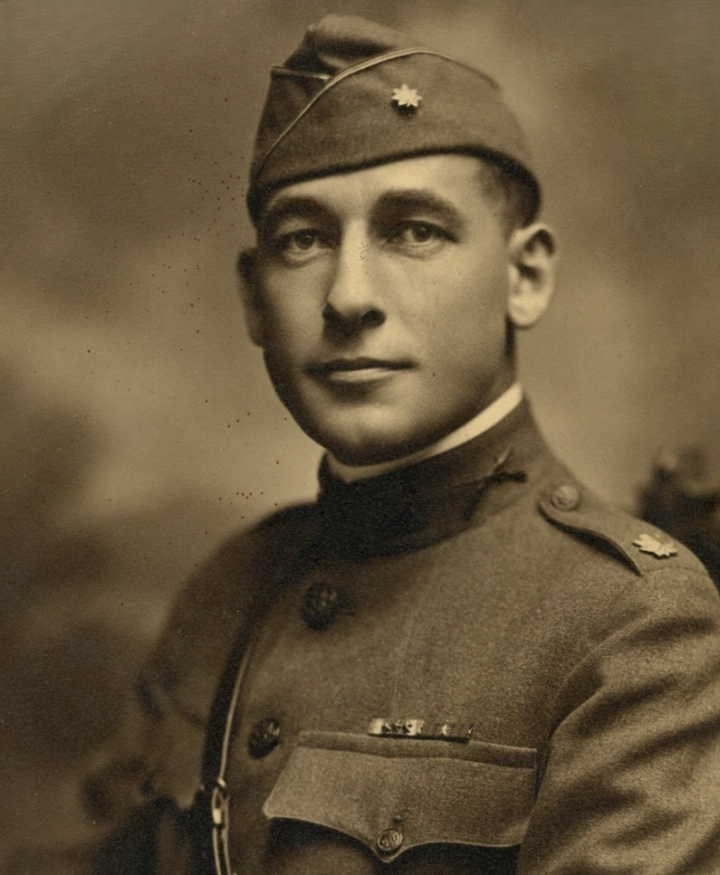
Patch as a major, circa 1919

Patch's first assignment as a lieutenant was with the 10th Infantry Regiment in Panama. From 1914 to 1917, he served with the 26th Infantry Regiment in Texas during the Mexican Border War. While in Texas, he established a temporary military base in Kingsville, Texas which has been commemorated as Camp Kingsville. During World War I, he served with the 18th Infantry Regiment and participated in extensive combat in France. He advanced to major as commander of the regiment's 1st Battalion, and received the Distinguished Service Cross for his heroism while leading his command during combat near Chaudun in July 1918. (Note: Patch received the award at a ceremony that took place in January 1923; it was presented by Major General Charles Henry Muir with the Lehigh University student body and faculty in attendance.) He was wounded during this attack, and convalesced at the base hospital in Bordeaux; news articles from September 1918 indicated that he was shot in the right shoulder, with the bullet passing down his right side and through his lung. From December 1918 to June 1919, Patch commanded 1st Battalion, 805th Pioneer Infantry as it conducted post-war duty in France that included identifying and stockpiling ammunition and other materiel so it could be destroyed or transported back to the United States.

After World War I, Patch served at Fort Benning's Infantry School as an instructor of engineering. In 1922, he completed the school's advanced course for Infantry Officers. From 1922 to 1924, he was professor of military science and tactics at Lehigh University and commander of the university's Reserve Officers' Training Corps (ROTC) unit. In 1925, Patch graduated from the United States Army Command and General Staff College. From 1925 to 1929, he served with the 29th Infantry at Fort Benning, Georgia.

== Continued career ==
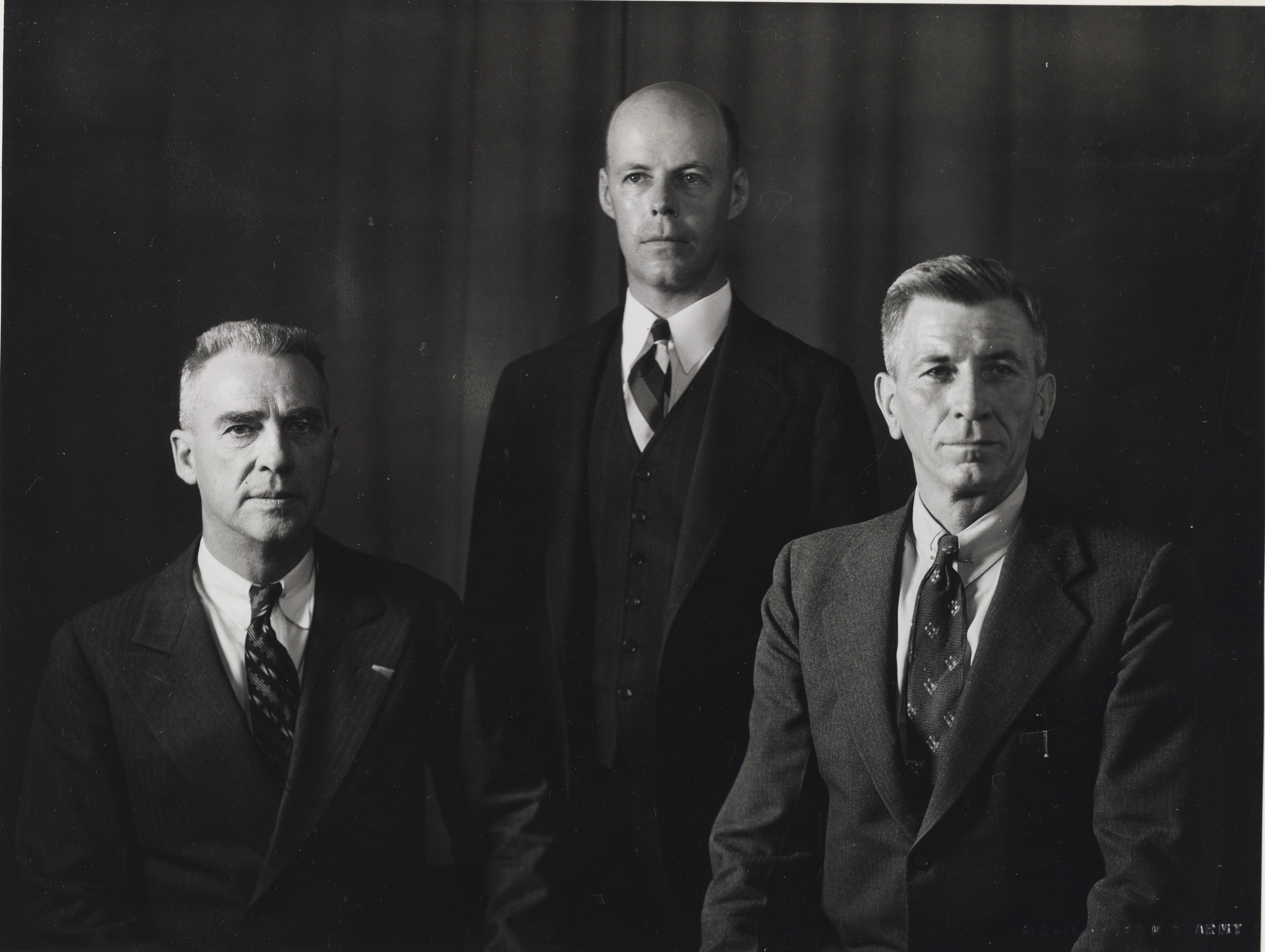
L to R: Army officers Karl Truesdell, Avery Cooper, and Patch, May 8, 1936

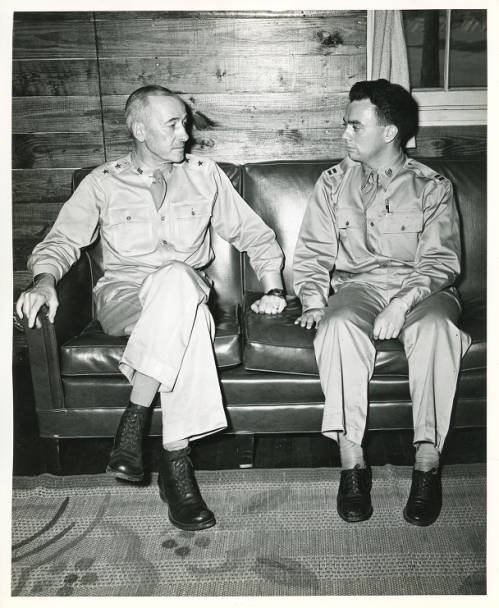
Patch and aide H. C. Byrd, Camp Forrest, 1942

In 1929, Patch was assigned to staff duty in the office of the army's Chief of Infantry. In 1933, he was assigned to duty with the 23rd Infantry at Fort Sam Houston. From 1934 to 1935, Patch attended the United States Army War College. In 1935, he was appointed professor of military science and tactics at the University of Maryland, College Park and commander of the school's ROTC program. In 1939, Patch was assigned to the faculty at the Army War College. From 1940 to 1941, Patch commanded the 34th Infantry Regiment. During the 1941 Carolina Maneuvers, he commanded the 87th Infantry Brigade, a unit of the 44th Infantry Division.

In May 1942, Patch was promoted to major general and in August he was appointed to command the 80th Infantry Division. He assumed command during the unit's initial organization and training at Camp Forrest, Tennessee. He remained in command until March 1943, when he was posted to the Caribbean Defense Command as commander of the Trinidad Sector and Base Command. In July 1944, Patch was assigned to command the Army Service Forces Training Center at Fort Lewis, Washington. He continued to serve in this post until the end of the war, and retired from the military in December 1945.

== Retirement and death ==
In retirement, Patch resided in Corpus Christi, Texas, where he authored several historical works. Among his books were: The Battle of Ball's Bluff (1958); Concentration of Zachary Taylor's Army at Corpus Christi, Texas (1962); The Battle of Bladensburg (1963); Bloody Shiloh (1964); Hannibal, 249-183 B.C. (1965); and A Soldier's War (1966).

Patch died in Corpus Christi on November 21, 1966. He was buried at Seaside Memorial Park in Corpus Christi.

== Awards ==
In addition to the Distinguished Service Cross for his First World War heroism, Patch was a recipient of the Purple Heart and the French Croix de guerre.

=== Distinguished Service Cross citation ===
The President of the United States of America, authorized by Act of Congress, July 9, 1918, takes pleasure in presenting the Distinguished Service Cross to Major (Infantry) Joseph D. Patch, United States Army, for extraordinary heroism in action while serving with 18th Infantry Regiment, 1st Division, A.E.F., near Chaudun, France, 18 July 1918. The leading battalion having encountered heavy resistance and his battalion having been ordered to pass through the leading battalion, Major Patch, because so many of his officers and men had been killed or wounded, with the greatest courage, coolness, and efficiency, personally led the assault of his battalion on the final objective. As a result of his fearlessness and leadership the objective was carried and he was severely wounded.

Service: Army Rank: Major Division: 1st Division, American Expeditionary Forces General Orders: War Department, General Orders No. 56 (1922)

== Family ==
In November 1916, Patch married Minerva M. King of Alfred, Texas, a granddaughter of Richard King and Henrietta King. They were married until his death and were the parents of three sons, Army officers William A. Patch (Major General) and Richard King Patch (Captain), and artist Joseph D. Patch Jr. (Corporal, United States Marine Corps).

== Effective dates of rank ==
- Private to Corporal, June 27, 1909 to August 27, 1911
- Second Lieutenant, August 28, 1911 (Effective July 20, 1911)
- First Lieutenant, July 1, 1916
- Captain, May 15, 1917
- Major (Temporary), January 5, 1918
- Captain, March 15, 1920
- Major, July 1, 1920
- Lieutenant Colonel, August 1, 1935
- Colonel, July 1, 1940
- Brigadier General (Temporary), August 31, 1941
- Major General (Temporary), May 24, 1942
- Major General (Retired), December 31, 1945
