= Glenn Walker =

Glenn Walker might refer to:

- Glenn Walker (footballer, born 1967), English footballer
- Glenn D. Walker (1916–2002), American soldier
- Glen Walker (born 1952), American football player
