= 395th Infantry Regiment =

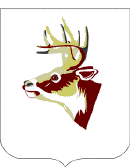
- 395th Infantry Regiment coat of arms.
- Active: 1918; 1921-1945; 1999-present
- Country: United States
- Branch: United States Army
- Type: Infantry
- Size: Regiment
- Nickname: Butler's Battlin' Blue Bastards (3rd Battalion)
- Mottos: "Vigilans Et Celer" (Vigilant and Swift)
- Engagements: World War II: Rhineland; Ardennes-Alsace; Central Europe

Insignia
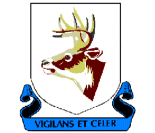
- Distinctive unit insignia

The 395th Infantry Regiment was an infantry regiment of the United States Army, part of the 99th Infantry Division during World War II. It was organized with the rest of the 99th on 16 November 1942 at Camp Van Dorn, Mississippi. During the Battle of the Bulge, the regiment—at times virtually surrounded by Germans—was one of the few units that did not yield ground to the attacking Germans. On at least six occasions they called in artillery strikes on or directly in front of their own positions. Their success in defending Höfen resulted in the 395th Infantry being repeatedly assigned to other divisions for difficult assignments during the remainder of the war, earning them the sobriquet, Butler's Blue Battlin' Bastards. The unit was inactivated after World War II, then became a reserve unit, and was redesignated as the 395th Regiment in 1999.

== Interwar period ==
The 395th Infantry was demobilized on 30 November 1918 as an inactive element of the 99th Division. It was reconstituted in the Organized Reserve on 24 June 1921, assigned to the 99th Division, and allotted to the Third Corps Area. It was initiated on 7 December 1921 with regimental headquarters at Franklin, Pennsylvania. Subordinate battalion headquarters were concurrently organized as follows: 1st Battalion at Butler, Pennsylvania; 2nd Battalion at Kane, Pennsylvania; and 3rd Battalion at Ridgway, Pennsylvania. The regimental headquarters was relocated on 11 December 1929 to Uniontown. The regiment conducted summer training most years with the 12th Infantry Regiment at Fort George G. Meade or Fort Howard, Maryland, and some years with the 34th Infantry Regiment at Fort Eustis, Virginia. Also conducted infantry Citizens Military Training Camps some years at Fort George G. Meade or Fort Howard as an alternate form of summer training. The primary ROTC feeder schools for new Reserve lieutenants for the regiment were Pennsylvania State College and Pennsylvania Military College.

== World War II ==
- Activated: 16 November 1942
- Overseas: 30 September 1944
- Campaigns: Rhineland, Ardennes-Alsace, Central Europe
- Days of combat: 151
- Unit Awards: Presidential Unit Citations – 1
- Individual Awards:
  - Medal of Honor – 1
  - Distinguished Service Cross (United States) – 2
- Commanding Officers:
  - 395th Infantry Regiment: Col. Alexander J. Mackenzie / Lt. Col. Griffin
    - 1st Battalion: Maj. Davis
    - 2nd Battalion: Lt. Col. Boyden
    - 3rd Battalion: Lt. Col. McClernand Butler (1 November 1942 – 30 April 1945) Lt. Col. J.A. Gallagher (1 May 1945 – 29 September 1945)
- Returned to U.S.: July 1945
- Inactivated: 29 September 1945 at Camp Myles Standish, Massachusetts.
- Organized Reserves redesignated 25 March 1948 as the Organized Reserve Corps; redesignated 9 July 1952 as the Army Reserve
- Relieved 29 October 1998 from assignment to the 99th Infantry Division
- Redesignated 17 October 1999 as the 395th Regiment and reorganized to consist of the 1st, 2d, and 3d Battalions, elements of the 75th Division (Training Support); 1st, 2nd, and 3rd Battalions concurrently allotted to the Regular Army

The regiment was organized with three battalions, each containing three rifle companies and a weapons company armed with .30 caliber and .50 caliber machine guns. The battalion also had its own Intelligence and Reconnaissance Platoon, as well as medics and support personnel.

- An Infantry Regiment consisted of: 3 Infantry Battalions | Regimental Headquarters and Headquarters Company | Service Company | Cannon Company | Anti-Tank Company | Medical Detach
- Each Infantry Battalion consisted of (35 officers and 825 men): 3 Rifle Companies | 1 Heavy Weapons Company | Battalion Headquarters and Headquarters Company
- Companies were lettered: 1st Battalion (Companies A-B-C-D) | 2nd Battalion (Companies E-F-G-H) | 3rd Battalion (Companies I-K-L-M) | *Companies D, H and M were Heavy Weapons Companies

=== Training and tactics ===
The regiment arrived at Camp Van Dorn in early December. The camp was newly built, and the barracks were covered in tar paper. From Camp Van Dorn they were transferred to the more established Camp Maxey in Paris, Texas for additional training. They engaged in division-level maneuvers in July 1944. The 395th was held in the United States until more room was available for the unit to enter Europe. From Camp Maxey they took a train to Camp Myles Standish outside Boston. The 99th boarded ships bound for England on 10 October 1944 and briefly stayed at Camp Marabout, Dorchester, England.

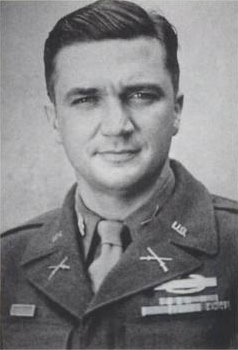
Lt. Col. McClernand Butler, commander of the 395th Infantry in World War II.

On 5 March 1941, as the United States began to mobilize for the possibility of war, McClernand Butler became a second lieutenant in the Regular Army. Butler's great-grandfather, General John Alexander McClernand, commanded infantry during the Civil War. Butler's uncle, General Edward J. McClernand, fought in the Indian Wars and was awarded the Medal of Honor. Butler's father had been a major in the Illinois National Guard and urged his son to become a guardsman when he was 16 years old. Butler attended but did not graduate from the U.S. Military Academy at West Point. He returned to Illinois and in 1933 was commissioned a second lieutenant in the National Guard. On 1 February 1944, Major Butler assumed command of the 3rd Battalion, 395th Regiment. Butler was promoted to lieutenant colonel on 21 March 1944, and remained in command of the 395th until 30 April 1945, when he collapsed from exhaustion. The war was over six days later.

The Army operated a program designed to capitalize on the large number of educated and intelligent recruits that were available. The program was called the Army Specialized Training Program (ASTP), and it sought to give extra training and special skills to a select group of intelligent and able young men, most of whom were taken from America's colleges. The program never fulfilled its promise, and the large number of "ASTPers" were rapidly integrated into various divisions to make up for personnel shortages in front line units during 1944. This quick infusion of personnel into the 99th Division occurred in March 1944, when more than 3000 joined the division. The sudden infusion of new men caused some friction with the old hands in the short term, but the long-term effects were generally positive. Many of the 99th Division's best soldiers were products of the ill-fated ASTP program.

Allied forces were fighting their way across France, and fresh units were badly needed in autumn 1944 to continue to press the offensive. The breakout from Saint-Lô, France was accomplished far more rapidly than Allied planners had dared hope, and American units plunged through the French countryside with undreamed of rapidity, far in advance of operational plans. American press reports from the European theater foretold the imminent fall of the Third Reich, and many men in Lt. Col. Butler's battalion thought that the war just might be over before they got there. This did not turn out to be true.

=== Deployment to the front ===
On 1 November 1944, the 99th Infantry Division, comprising the 393rd, 394th, and the 395th Infantry Regiments, was put under operational control of V Corps, First Army. On 3 November 1944, the 395th Regiment disembarked at Le Havre, France. The 395th were moved by train and truck, and finally by foot, to front line positions near the German town of Höfen a few kilometers west of the Siegfried Line and near the Belgium-German border.

No one had anticipated such a rapid Allied advance. Troops were fatigued by weeks of continuous combat, Allied supply lines were stretched extremely thin, and supplies were dangerously depleted. While the supply situation improved in October, the manpower situation was still critical. General Eisenhower and his staff chose the Ardennes region, held by the First Army, as an area that could be held by as few troops as possible. The Ardennes area was chosen because of a lack of operational objectives for the Allies, the terrain offered good defensive positioning, roads were lacking, and the Germans were known to be using the area within Germany to the east as a rest and refit area for their troops.

Col. Butler went ahead to look over the area they were assigned to defend. He found that his 600 riflemen were assigned an extremely large area about 6,000 yards (5,500 m) long without any units in reserve.

That is three to four times wider than recommended by Army textbooks. I never dreamed that we would have a defensive position of this size without any backup or help from our division or regiment. When I got to Höfen, I found the area too big to cover in one afternoon. So I stayed in the village overnight."

The battalion dug in, its purpose to hold the line so that other units could attack key dams across the Roer River. In early December, the front was unusually calm, and the weather was bone-chilling cold. The 99th held lines stretching from Monschau, Germany to Losheimergraben, Belgium, totaling 35 kilometres (22 mi). The 393rd, 394th, and 395th Regiments were put online, each unit protecting approximately 11 kilometres (6.8 mi) of front, roughly equivalent to one front-line infantry man every 91 metres (299 ft). Butler held a single platoon of 40 men from Company L in reserve. In the event of an emergency, the battalion headquarters and company administrative personnel, including clerks and motor-pool staff, were to join the platoon, creating a small reserve force of about 100 men.

Around Höfen, which the 395th defended, the ground was marked with open hills. On the east lay a section of the Monschau Forest. Just south of Höfen, the lines of the 99th entered this forest, ran through a long belt of timber to the boundary between the V and VIII Corps at the Losheim Gap. The thick forest was tangled with rocky gorges, little streams, and sharp hills.

The area around Höfen and Monschau were critical because of the road network that lay behind them. During the battle to come, if the Germans succeeded in taking Höfen, their ranks would be swelled rapidly, and the 99th and 2nd Infantry Divisions would be outflanked and could be attacked from the rear. For their part, the German army was planning a seven-day campaign to seize Antwerp.

To the north of Höfen lay a paved main road that led through the Monschau Forest, at whose eastern edge it forked. A second road ran parallel to the division center and right wing, leaving the Höfen road at the small hamlet of Wahlerscheid, and continued south through two very small villages, the twin towns of Rocherath and Krinkelt. It then intersected a main east–west road at Bullingen. This was the road network the Germans needed to meet their objectives. If the Germans penetrated Höfen, the U.S. soldiers would have to withdraw several miles to the next defensible position.

=== Battle of the Bulge ===
In early December, much of the Allied forces were established in a general defensive line from the North Sea to the Swiss border. Specific units were charged with penetrating Germany's West Wall.

==== Defense of Höfen ====
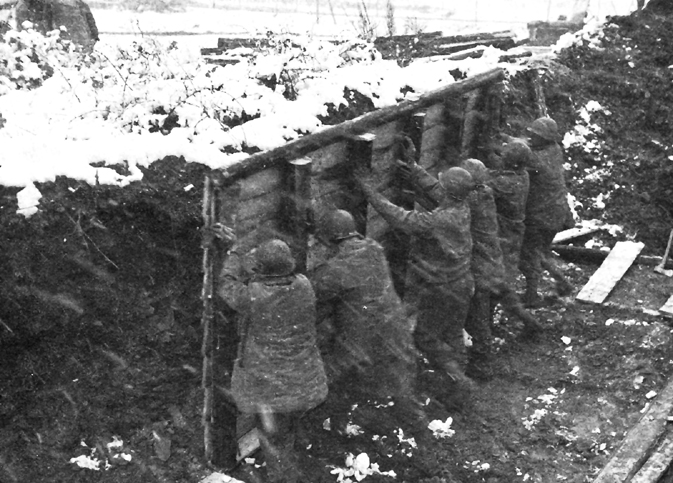
Soldiers constructing a winterized hut near the front lines in the 99th Divisions' sector.

The 3rd Battalion, 395th Infantry, led by Lt. Col. McClernand Butler, occupied the area around Höfen, Germany, on the border with Belgium during early December. The terrain was open and rolling, and over six weeks the 3rd Battalion prepared dug-in positions that possessed good fields of fire. The 38th Cavalry Squadron (led by Lt. Col. Robert E. O'Brien) was deployed to the north along the railroad track between Mutzenich and Konzen station. The 1st Battalion was positioned on the right. The infantry at Höfen lay in a foxhole line along a 910 metres (2,990 ft) front on the eastern side of the village, backed up by dug-out support positions. These would later prove instrumental in defending themselves from the attacking Germans and in protecting themselves when their own artillery fired on or just in front of their own positions, which happened at least six times over the next few weeks. They inflicted disproportionate casualties on the Germans and were one of the only units that did not give ground during the Battle of the Bulge.

Because of the success of the 395th and the 99th, the Americans maintained effective freedom to maneuver across the north flank of the German's line of advance and continually limited the success of the German offensive.

The 395th hit the attacking Germans with such terrific small arms and machine gun fire that the Germans couldn't even remove their dead and wounded in their rapid retreat. The accurate fire from the 12 3-inch guns of A Company, 612th Tank Destroyer Battalion, was instrumental in keeping German tanks from advancing. During the first day of the Battle of the Bulge, the 3rd Battalion took 19 prisoners and killed an estimated 200 Germans. Accurate estimates of German wounded were not possible, but about 20 percent of the 326th Volksgrenadier Division were lost. The 395th's casualties were extremely light: four dead, seven wounded, and four men missing.

On another day, the 3rd Battalion took 50 Germans prisoner and killed or wounded more than 800 Germans, losing only five dead and seven wounded themselves. On more than one occasion, BAR gunners would allow Germans to get within feet of their positions before opening fire, with the objective of increasing the odds of killing the attacking Germans. "In two cases, the enemy fell in the BAR gunners' foxholes." On at least six occasions they called in artillery strikes on or directly in front of their own positions.

As the battle ensued, small units, company and less in size, often acting independently, conducted fierce local counterattacks and mounted stubborn defenses, frustrating the German's plans for a rapid advance, and badly upsetting their timetable. By 17 December, German military planners knew that their objectives along the Elsenborn Ridge would not be taken as soon as planned.

The 99th lost about 20% of its effective strength, including 465 killed and 2,524 evacuated due to wounds, injuries, fatigue, or trench foot. German casualties were likewise heavy but irreplaceable.

On 28 January 1945, after six weeks of the most intense and relentless combat of the war in the biggest battle of World War II, involving approximately 1.3 million men, the Allies declared the Ardennes Offensive, or Battle of the Bulge, officially over. The 3rd Battalion, 395th Regiment had acquitted itself with valor, having held its lines despite the harsh winter weather, the enemy's numerical superiority and greater numbers of armored units.

==== Awards ====
The 3rd Battalion received a Presidential Unit Citation for its actions around Höfen from 16 to 19 December. It was credited with destroying "seventy-five percent of three German infantry regiments." The citation read:

During the German offensive in the Ardennes, the Third Battalion in the 395th Infantry, was assigned the mission of holding the Monschau-Eupen-Liege Road. For four successive days the battalion held this sector against combined German tank and infantry attacks, launched with fanatical determination and supported by heavy artillery. No reserves were available . . . and the situation was desperate. On at least six different occasions the battalion was forced to place artillery concentrations dangerously close to its own positions in order to repulse penetrations and restore its lines . . .

The enemy artillery was so intense that communications were generally out. The men carried out missions without orders when their positions were penetrated or infiltrated. They killed Germans coming at them from the front, flanks and rear. Outnumbered five to one, they inflicted casualties in the ratio of 18 to one. With ammunition supplies dwindling rapidly, the men obtained German weapons and utilized ammunition obtained from casualties to drive off the persistent foe. Despite fatigue, constant enemy shelling, and ever-increasing enemy pressure, the Third Battalion guarded a 6,000 yards (5,500 m)-long front and destroyed 75 percent of three German infantry regiments.

General Order Number 16, 6 March 1945

The 395th, entrenched along the "International Road" and Elsenborn Ridge, forced the Germans to commit and sacrifice many of their infantrymen and expose their armored formations to withering artillery fire. The regiment's successful defense prevented the Germans, who had counted on surprise, numbers, and minimum hard fighting as their keys to success, from accessing the best routes into the Belgium interior, and seriously delayed their scheduled advance by more than 48 hours, allowing the Americans to move large numbers of units and bring up reserves.

==== Enemy respect in combat ====
German prisoners captured during the Battle of the Bulge volunteered praise of the 99th's effective defense of Höfen. A captured Lt. Bemener, formerly commander of the 5th Company of the 753rd Volksgrenadier Regiment, asked his American interrogator about the unit that had defended Höfen. Told it was the 3rd Battalion, 395th Infantry, he said, "It must have been one of your best formations." Asked why he thought so, he said, "Two reasons: one cold-bloodedness; two efficiency." Another German officer who was captured said, "I have fought two years on the Russian front, but never have I engaged in such a fierce and bloody battle."

Two Distinguished Service Crosses and several Silver Stars were awarded to members of the battalion for valorous actions against the enemy during this battle. Sgt. T. E. Piersall and Pfc. Richard Mills were awarded the Distinguished Service Cross.

=== Additional offensive operations ===
After a short period off the line, the battalion conducted offensive operations in Germany, including the seizure of several German towns from 1 to 5 March. The first town they were tasked with capturing was Bergheim, "the door to the Rhine." Butler's regiment crossed the Erft Canal near the Rhine and enlarged the bridgehead, taking that town with a night attack without losing a single man. Butler said, "The biggest difficulty in carrying out a night attack is control, and having men who can coordinate well as a team in the dark. I decided to stage the night attack at Bergheim because my troops would be going across an open area about 500 yards (460 m) long and 400 yards (370 m) wide. There was no cover. It was like a golf course, so I used the night for concealment."

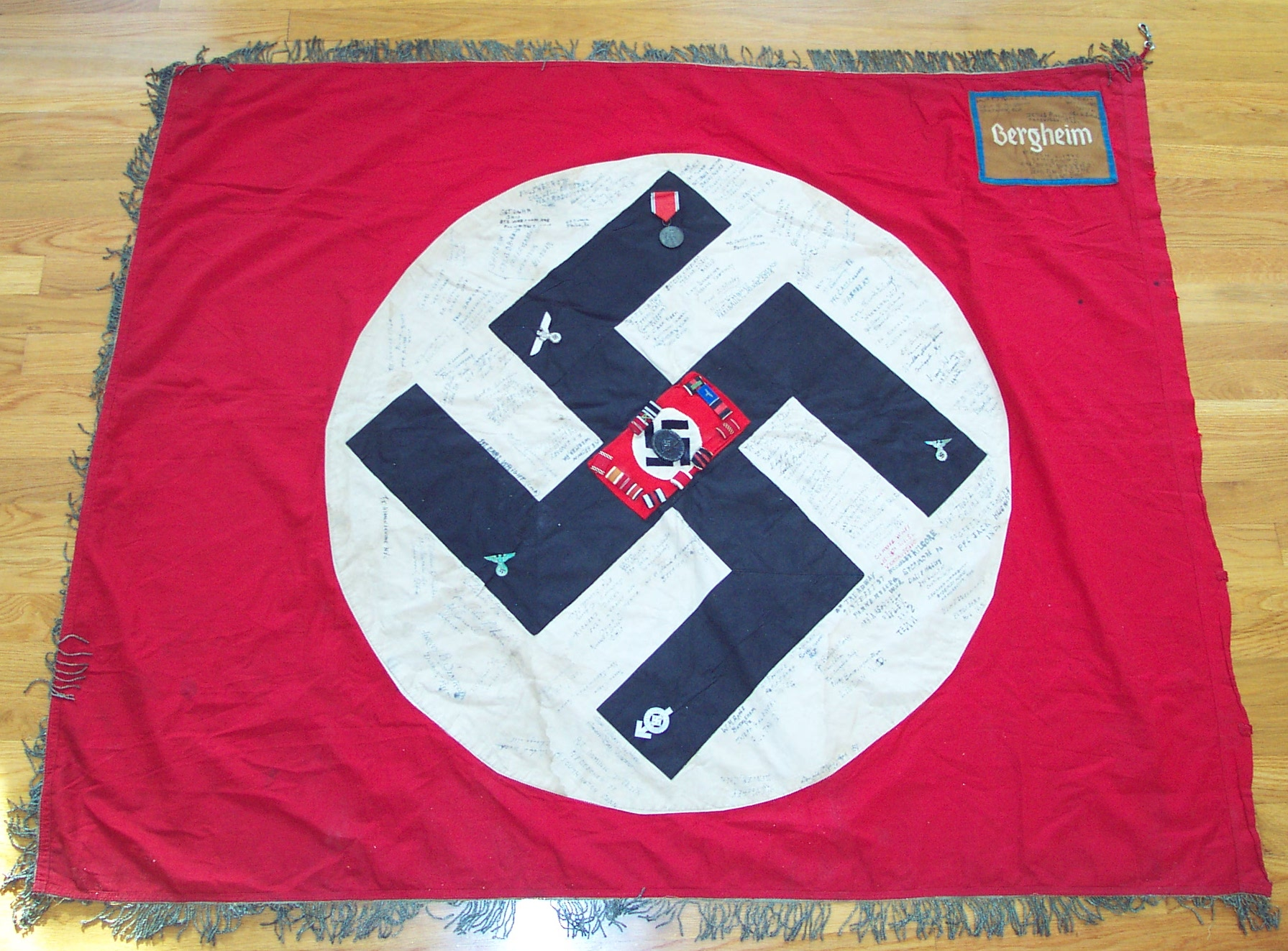
Flag signed by the men of the 3rd Battalion, 395th Regiment after seizing Bergheim, Germany, 1 March 1945

The 395th Regiment's success earned it many difficult assignments. A U.S. Army World War II division was configured as a Triangular division, with three regimental maneuver elements. Up to that point, the Army had married a battalion of tanks to a battalion of infantry in support of the tanks. But the infantry often bore worse casualties than the tanks did and had to be replaced and reinforced more quickly. This required the corps commander to draw on an infantry battalion from another division, and because of the reputation the 395th had earned at Höfen, it was transferred often to various divisions, including the 9th Infantry Division, the 3rd Armored Division, and the 7th Armored Division. "Blue" was the code word for the 3rd battalion under Army infantry's triangular organization.

The town of Kuckhof cost the battalion dearly, with more than fifty casualties inflicted on one company alone (I Company). The remainder of the battalion reached the Rhine River on that same day and crossed the Remagen Bridge which four days after being captured was still being shelled by German artillery. They then crossed the Wied River, where they joined up with the 7th Infantry Division. They were tasked with moving 10 miles (16 km) behind the German lines and cutting the Autobahn to prevent the withdrawal of the Germans.

They continued to fight even as the American press trumpeted the rapid crumbling of German resistance. The regiment helped to capture the Ruhr Pocket, where thousands of German troops and hundreds of German vehicles were captured. The unit crossed the Altmuhl River on 25 April, the Danube River on 27 April, and the Isar River on 30 April. There Major Butler collapsed due to exhaustion on 30 April, and Lt. Col. J. A. Gallagher assumed command for the last few days of the war. When hostilities ceased on 7 May 1945, the regiment had during six months of fighting experienced 300 percent turnover due to casualties. The regiment assumed occupation duties in Hammelburg and Bad Brückenau until it was shipped home in the summer of 1945. Lt. Col. Butler retired from the Army on 14 January 1946 and worked for the phone company for the rest of his career.

=== Nickname ===
The regiment's (3rd Battalion) earned the sobriquet Butler's Battlin' Blue Bastards derived from the name of its single commander, its special fighting abilities, the battalion's color designation, and because the regiment was often lent out and belonged to no one.

=== Commendation ===
Two months later, when the 99th Division was transferred to VII Corps under Maj. Gen. Walter E. Lauer, the commanding officer of V Corps, Maj. Gen. Clarence R. Huebner, wrote him:

The 99th Infantry Division arrived in this theater without previous combat experience early in November 1944. It ... was committed to the attack on 12 Dec.... Early on the morning of 16 Dec., the German Sixth Panzer Army launched its now historic counteroffensive which struck your command in the direction of Losheim and Honsfeld... On 18 Dec., the 3rd Battalion of the 395th Infantry gave a magnificent account of itself in an extremely heavy action against the enemy in the Höfen area and was the main factor in stopping the hostile effort to penetrate the lines of the V Corps in the direction of Monschau... The 99th Infantry Division received its baptism of fire in the most bitterly contested battle that has been fought since the current campaign on the European continent began... Your organization gave ample proof of the fact that it is a good hard fighting division and one in which you and each and every member of your command can be justly proud...

Major Butler was decorated with the Silver Star, the French Croix de Guerre, the Belgian Fourragère, the Belgian Order de la Couronne, and the Bronze Star Medal with the Oak leaf cluster. Because of Major Butler's success in leading his battalion in successful night attacks during the war, which the U.S. Army handbook did not recommend, the French army later asked him to write a paper on battalion-size night attacks.

=== Campaign streamers ===
The 395th received the following campaign streamers:

Conflict	Streamer	Year(s)
World War II	Rhineland	1944
World War II	Ardennes-Alsace	1944
World War II	Central Europe	1945

=== Unit decorations ===
The entire regiment was recognized with the following unit decorations:

Ribbon	Award	Year	Notes
	Presidential Unit Citation	1944	Battle of the Bulge

=== Individual decorations ===
- Belgian Fourragère 1940.
  - Cited in the Order of the Day of the Belgian Army for action at the Siegfried Line.
  - Cited in the Order of the Day of the Belgian Army for action at Elsenborn Crest.
- 2nd and 3rd Battalion cited in the Order of the Day of the Belgian Army for action in the Ardennes.
- Medal of Honor Citation to T/Sgt Vernon McGarity, Company L, 393rd Infantry, 99th Infantry Division, for action on 16–17 December 1944.

== Heraldry and colors ==
=== Distinctive unit insignia ===
A silver color metal and enamel device 37/32 inches (2.94 cm) in height overall consisting of a shield blazoned: Argent, a buck's head attired of ten tynes couped Or. Attached below the shield a silver scroll inscribed "VIGILANS ET CELER" in Black letters.

Symbolism

The 395th Infantry, Organized Reserves, was organized in 1921. It had its headquarters at Franklin, Pennsylvania, and drew its personnel from Pennsylvania. The shield is silver, the old color of Infantry. The buck's head was used to indicate the allocation of the organization to the mountainous section of Pennsylvania, where deer abound.

Background

The distinctive unit insignia was originally approved for the 395th Regiment Infantry, Organized Reserves on 16 June 1931. It was redesignated with description updated, for the 395th Regiment on 7 June 1999.

=== Coat of arms ===
Blazon

Shield Argent, a buck's head attired of ten tynes couped Proper.

Crest That for the regiments and separate battalions of the Army Reserve: From a wreath Argent and Azure, the Lexington Minute Man Proper. The statue of the Minute Man, Captain John Parker, (H.H.Kitson, sculptor), stands on the common in Lexington, Massachusetts.

Motto VIGILANS ET CELER (Vigilant and Swift).

Symbolism

Shield The 395th Infantry, Organized Reserves, was organized in 1921. It had its headquarters at Franklin, Pennsylvania, and drew its personnel from Pennsylvania. The shield is silver, the old color of Infantry. The buck's head was used to indicate the allocation of the organization to the mountainous section of Pennsylvania, where deer abound.

Crest The crest is that of the U.S. Army Reserve.

Background

The coat of arms was originally approved for the 395th Regiment Infantry, Organized Reserves on 15 June 1931. It was redesignated for the 395th Regiment on 7 June 1999.

== Modern service ==
After the battalion was inactivated on 29 September 1945, its colors remained folded for more than fifty years. On 17 October 1999, the 3rd Battalion, 395th Regiment was reactivated as an Armor Training Support (TS) Battalion. With its sister battalions, the 1st, 395th Engineer and 2nd, 395th Field Artillery, the 3rd Battalion (TS) (AR) role is to train National Guard armor and infantry battalions across a three-state region and improve their combat readiness.
