= 120th Infantry Brigade (United States) =

- 120th Infantry Brigade Shoulder Sleeve Insignia
- Active: 1943–1945; 1997–1999; 2006 – present
- Country: United States
- Branch: United States Army
- Type: Infantry
- Role: Training
- Size: Brigade
- Part of: 85th Support Command
- Garrison/HQ: Fort Hood
- Engagements: Bastogne
- Decorations: Presidential Unit Citation; Superior Unit Award

Commanders
- Current commander: COL John P. O'Sullivan
- Command Sergeant Major: CSM LaVander N. Talley

Insignia
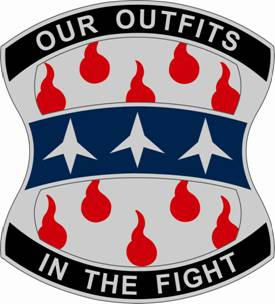
- Distinctive unit insignia

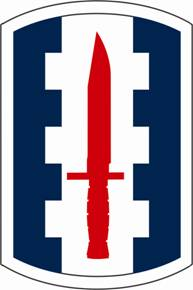
- Designated but not authorized shoulder sleeve insignia

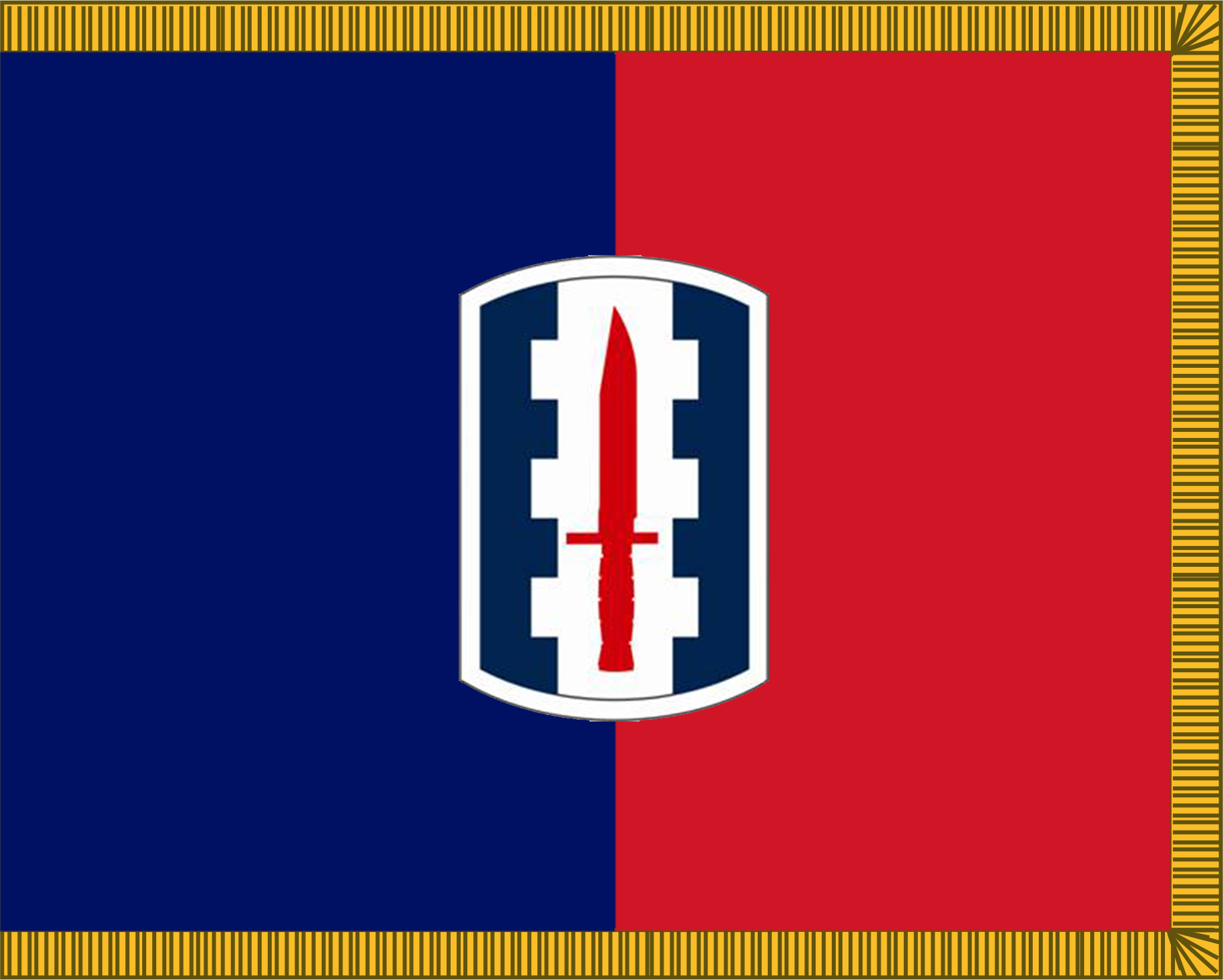
- 120th Infantry Brigade Flag

The 120th Infantry Brigade is an AC/RC unit based at Fort Hood, Texas. The unit falls under command of First Army Division West and validates United States Army Reserve & National Guard forces capability to execute operations in support of FORSCOM approved and Combatant Commander requirements.

== Organization ==
The 120th Infantry Brigade is a Combined Arms Training Brigade (CATB) assigned to the 85th Support Command. Like all formations of the 85th Support Command, the brigade is not a combat formation, but instead trains Army Reserve and Army National Guard units preparing for deployment. As of January 2026, the brigade consists of a Headquarters and Headquarters Company, five active duty battalions, and six reserve battalions.

- 120th Infantry Brigade, at Fort Hood (TX)
  - Headquarters and Headquarters Company, at Fort Hood (TX)
  - 3rd Battalion, 289th Regiment (Training Support), in Beaumont (TX)
  - 3rd Battalion, 356th Regiment (Logistical Support), at Fort Hunter Liggett (CA)
    - Detachment 1, 3rd Battalion, 356th Regiment (Logistical Support), at Joint Forces Training Base – Los Alamitos (CA)
    - Detachment 2, 3rd Battalion, 356th Regiment (Logistical Support), in Mesa (AZ)
  - 2nd Battalion, 360th Regiment (Training Support), at Camp Parks (CA)
  - 1st Battalion, 363rd Regiment (Training Support), at Camp Parks (CA)
  - 2nd Battalion, 381st Regiment (Training Support), in Grand Prairie (TX)
  - 2nd Battalion, 382nd Regiment (Logistical Support), at Fort Hood (TX)
  - 3rd Battalion, 382nd Regiment (Field Artillery), at Fort Hood (TX)
  - 1st Battalion, 393rd Regiment (Brigade Support Battalion), at Fort Hood (TX)
  - 2nd Battalion, 393rd Regiment (Infantry), at Fort Hood (TX)
  - 1st Battalion, 395th Regiment (Brigade Engineer Battalion), at Fort Hood (TX)
  - 2nd Battalion, 395th Regiment (Brigade Support Battalion), at Fort Hood (TX)

The brigade's four training support battalions and two logistical support battalions are Army Reserve formations.

== Lineage ==
- Constituted 26 March 1943 in the Army of the United States as Headquarters, 3d Armored Infantry Group
- Activated 31 March 1943 at Camp Chaffee, Arkansas
- Reorganized and redesignated 30 March 1943 as Headquarters, 3d Armored Group
- Reorganized and redesignated 14 September 1943 as Headquarters, 12th Tank Group
- Reorganized and redesignated 13 December 1943 as Headquarters, 12th Armored Group
- Inactivated 20 October 1945 at Camp Gruber, Oklahoma
- Disbanded 2 July 1952
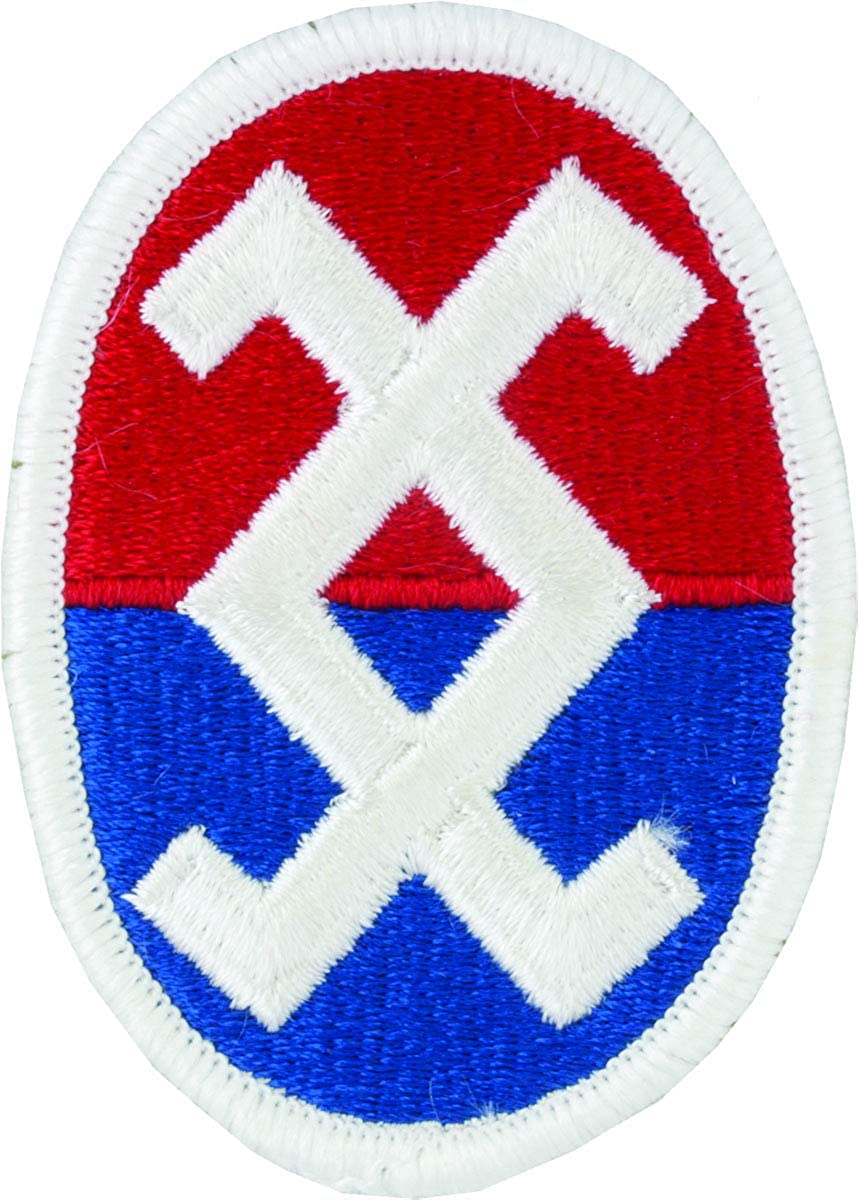
- Redesignated as the 120th Army Reserve Command in September 1963 until 1996.
- Reconstituted 24 October 1997 in the Regular Army as Headquarters, 120th Infantry Brigade, and activated at Fort Sam Houston, Texas
- Inactivated 16 October 1999 at Fort Sam Houston, Texas
- Activated 1 December 2006 at Fort Sam Houston, Texas

== Campaign streamers ==
Conflict	Streamer	Year(s)
World War II	Rhineland	1944
World War II	Ardennes-Alsace	1944
World War II	Central Europe	1945

== Unit Decorations ==
Ribbon	Award	Year	Notes
	Presidential Unit Citation	1944	Bastogne
	Army Superior Unit Award	2008-2011	Permanent Orders 332-07 announcing award of the Army Superior Unit award

== History ==
The Department of the Army originally constituted our current organization 26 March 1943 as Headquarters, 3rd Armored Infantry Group. This organization was subsequently reorganized and re-designated as the headquarters, 3rd Armored Group on 30 March 1943. The Army activated Headquarters, 3rd Armored Group at Fort Chaffee, Arkansas, on 31 March 1943. This organization reorganized and re-designated as Headquarters, 12th Tank Group on 14 September 1943.

The Army once again reorganized and re-designated our current organization as the 12th Armored Group on 13 December 1943 for service in World War II. The 12th Armored Group participated in the Ardennes-Alsace, Rhineland, and Central Europe Campaigns and was awarded the Presidential Unit Citation for actions during the Battle of Bastogne.

After World War II, the Army redeployed the 12th Armored Group to Camp Gruber, Oklahoma, where it was deactivated during October 1945.

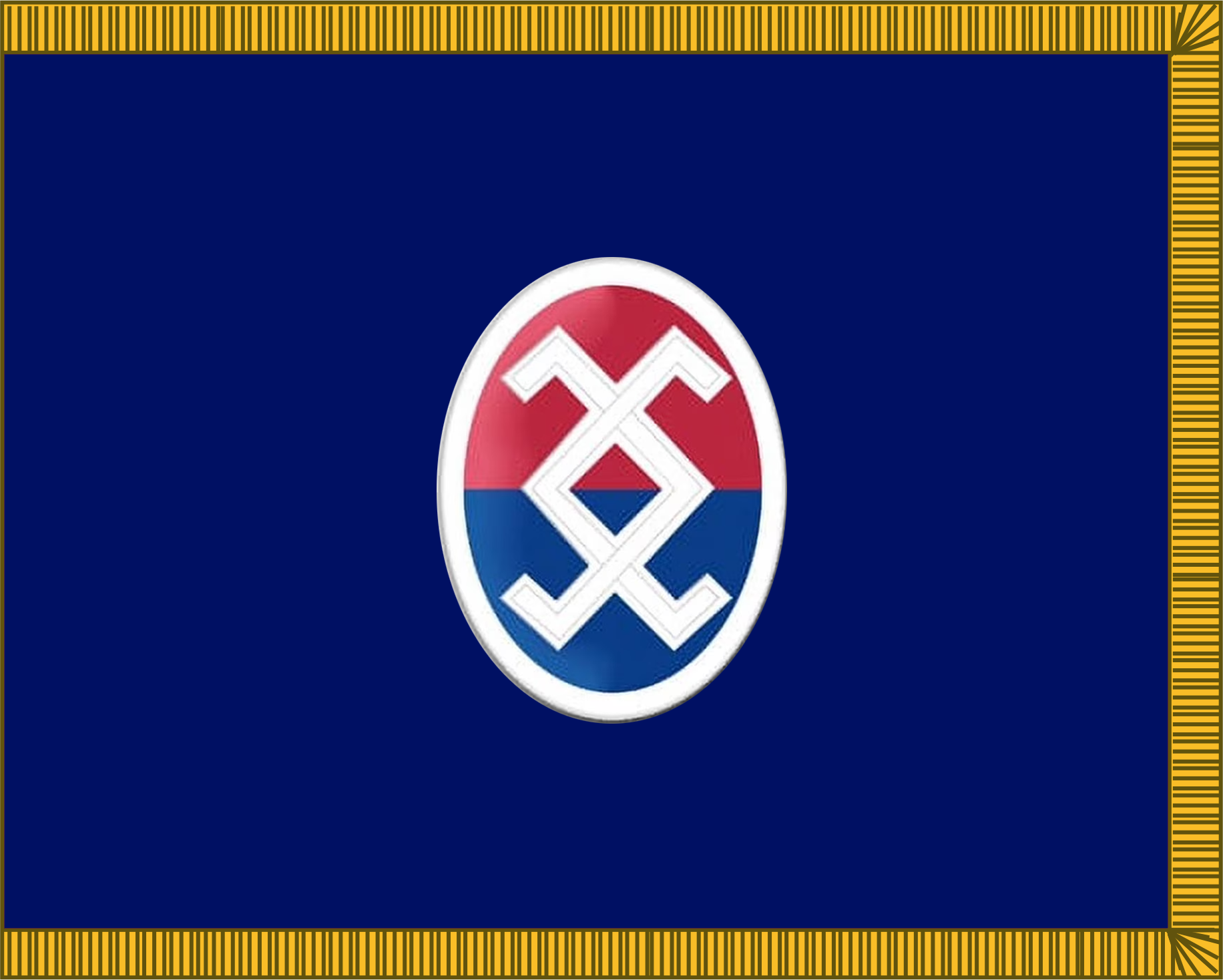
120th Army Reserve Command Flag

Redesignated as the 120th Army Reserve Command in September 1963 and repatched. The Army merged the Readiness Group Fort Sam Houston and 3rd Regional Training Brigade to become the 120th Infantry Brigade during October 1997 and returned their original insignia and flag.

The Army designated the 120th Infantry Brigade as the Training Support Brigade whose mission encompassed both the Readiness Group and the Readiness Training Brigade: training supervision and training evaluation.

The Army tasked the 120th Infantry Brigade with providing training support to National Guard and Army Reserve units. The 120th Infantry Brigade trained and evaluated National Guard and Reserve units at the National Maneuver Training Centers, Annual Training, and Individual Drill Weekends.

The Army re-designated the 120th Infantry Brigade as the 2nd Brigade, 75th Training Division at Fort Sam Houston, Texas, on 16 October 1999.

The Army reactivated the 120th Infantry Brigade on 1 December 2006 to serve the nation once again at Fort Sam Houston, Texas.

The Army moved the 120th Infantry Brigade to Fort Hood, Texas, on 1 September 2008 with a mission of providing post mobilization training to Army Reserve and National Guard Soldiers deploying to support the Global War on Terrorism

== Heraldry ==
- Distinctive unit insignia: The dark blue, the color traditionally used by the Infantry unit, denotes the Presidential Unit Citation awarded to the unit. The arched band refers to the unit's World War II campaign in the Battle of the Bulge. The caltrops represent the defensive success by the Allies to protect Bastogne, Belgium from the German Army. The field of Gutte de Sang symbolizes the Battle of Ardennes, Siege of Bastogne, one of the bloodiest conflicts during World War II.
- Shoulder sleeve insignia: The flag blue of the shoulder sleeve insignia is the color traditionally associated with Infantry units. The embattled pale suggests tank tracks, denoting the 120th Infantry's lineage as an armored unit. Red symbolizes the Brigade's striking capabilities. The bayonet signifies close combat, illustrating the Brigade's mission.
