= Hugo, Missouri =

Unincorporated community in Missouri, U.S.

Hugo Chauncey
- Unincorporated community
- Location of Hugo in Missouri
- Coordinates: 37°59′43″N 92°39′33″W
- Country: United States
- State: Missouri
- County: Camden
- Post office established: 1883

Hugo is an unincorporated community in southern Camden County, in the U.S. state of Missouri. The community is located approximately 3.5 miles east-southeast of Camdenton on Missouri Route V, just north of Missouri Route 7.

== History ==
The community was originally settled as a town called Chauncey. A post office called Chauncey was established in 1883. The town was platted in the 1890s. The name was changed to Hugo in 1914, and the post office closed in 1943. The origin of the name Hugo is obscure.

In the early 20th century, the community had two stores, a post office, a blacksmith, a grist mill, a school, a church, and several residences.

== Notable person ==
- Charles D. Franklin, US Army lieutenant general, born in Hugo in 1931.
