= James K. Woolnough =

United States Army general

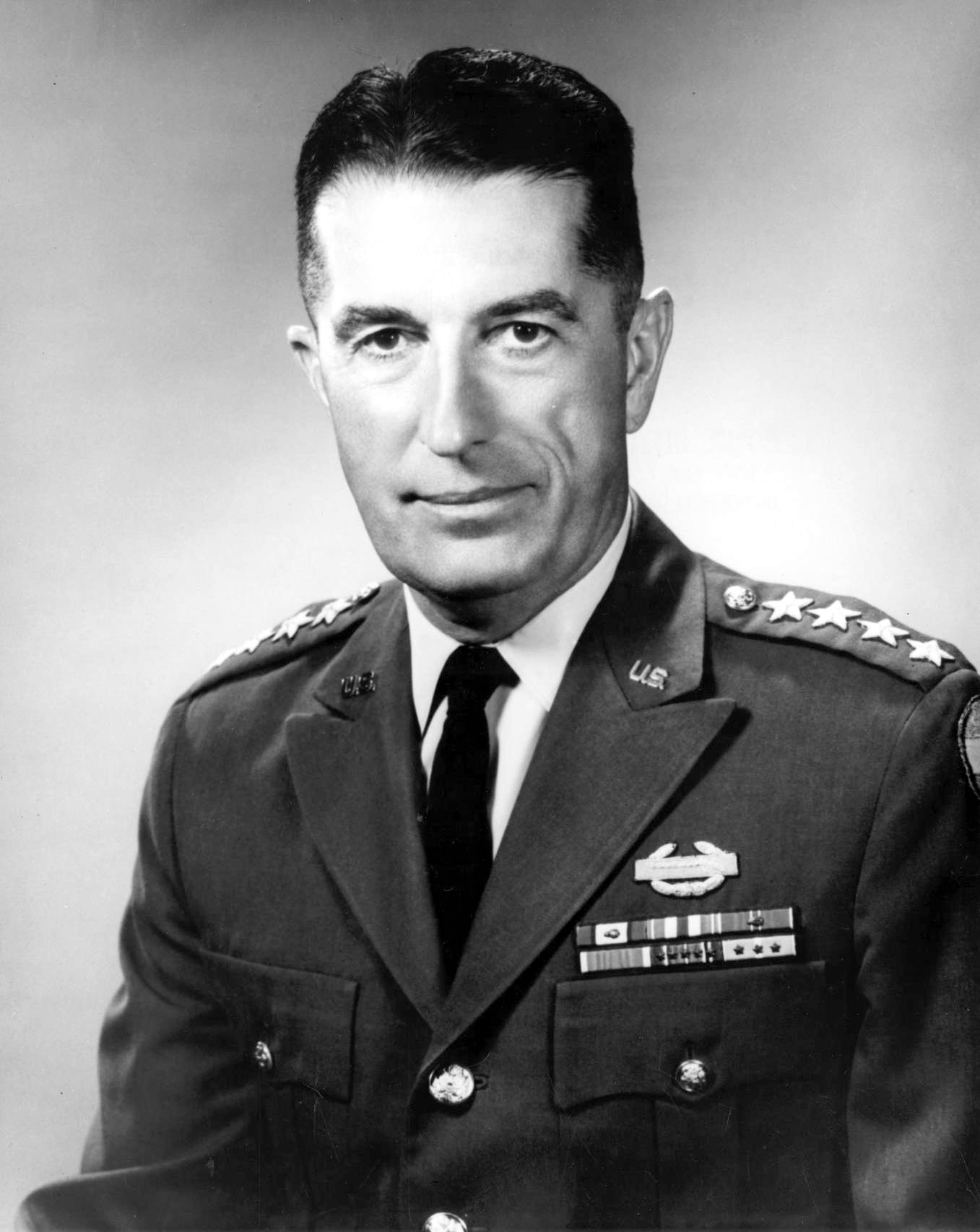
- Woolnough in 1967
- Born: 24 October 1910; Mindanao, Philippine Islands
- Died: 30 May 1996 (aged 85); Walter Reed Army Medical Center
- Military career
- Allegiance: United States of America
- Branch: United States Army
- Service years: 1932-1970
- Rank: General
- Nickname: "Gentleman Jim"
- Commands: Continental Army Command; 1st Cavalry Division; 7th Cavalry Regiment; 393rd Infantry Regiment
- Conflicts: World War II; Korean War; Cold War
- Awards: Distinguished Service Medal (2); Silver Star; Bronze Star Medal (2); Purple Heart; Combat Infantryman Badge

James Karrick Woolnough (24 October 1910 – 30 May 1996) was a United States Army four-star general who served as Commanding General of the United States Continental Army Command at Fort Monroe, Virginia. In this capacity he was responsible for the command and control of all active and reserve forces in the Six Armies of the Continental United States from 1967 to 1970.

== Military career ==
Born in Mindanao, Philippine Islands of Colonel and Mrs. James B. Woolnough, Woolnough attended the United States Military Academy at West Point, graduating in 1932. Further training included the U.S. Army Infantry School at Fort Benning and the National War College at Fort McNair, Washington, D.C. Additionally he was both a math instructor and a Regimental Commander at West Point.

During his 38 years of active duty, Woolnough held a variety of staff and command positions worldwide. Shortly after the D-Day Normandy Beach landing, June 1944, he became executive officer of the 16th Infantry, 1st Infantry Division. In February 1945, during the Battle of the Bulge, he assumed command of the 393rd Infantry Regiment, 99th Infantry Division, which later provided the vanguard forces to prevent the German destruction of the Remagen Bridge, thus making it possible for the U.S. forces to cross the Rhine.

In September 1950 he was sent to Korea, given a map, and instructed to head north to find the 1st Cavalry Division, which he did and for a time commanded the 7th Cavalry Regiment, the Garry Owen. Eleven years later, as a major general, he returned to Korea as the 1st Cavalry Division Commanding Officer.

In the Pacific theater on Joint Task Force Seven, he was Deputy Plans and Operations Officer for the first atomic tests at Eniwetok. Years later as a lieutenant general in 1963, he was Deputy Commander-in-Chief, U.S. Army Pacific at Fort Shafter, Hawaii.

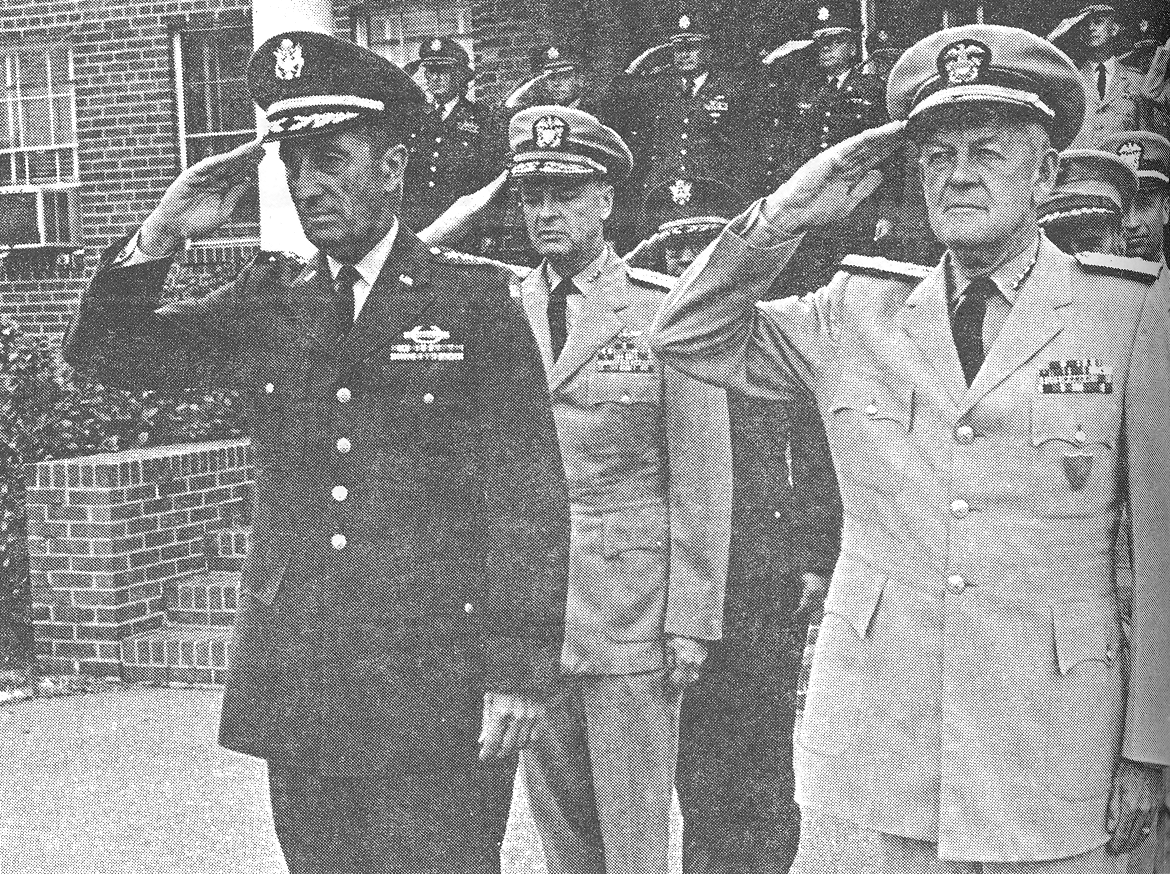
As commanding general of Continental Army Command (left), receiving welcoming honors at the Allied Command Atlantic headquarters of Admiral Ephraim P. Holmes (right), 1967.

Among his many assignments during his eighteen years in the Pentagon, he served as Chief of Staff of the NATO Standing Group, Director of Operations as well as Director of Plans for the U.S. Army General Staff, and Deputy Chief of Staff for Personnel, Department of the Army.

Upon retirement on 31 October 1970, Woolnough returned to his family home in Arlington, Virginia.

Woolnough died at Walter Reed Army Medical Center, and was buried in Arlington National Cemetery next to his first wife, Mary Agnes Woolnough, who had died in 1980. He was also married to Eleanor Perry Woolnough who died in 1991 and was survived by his last wife Mary Dabinet Woolnough.
