= Donn R. Pepke =

United States Army general (1916–1995)

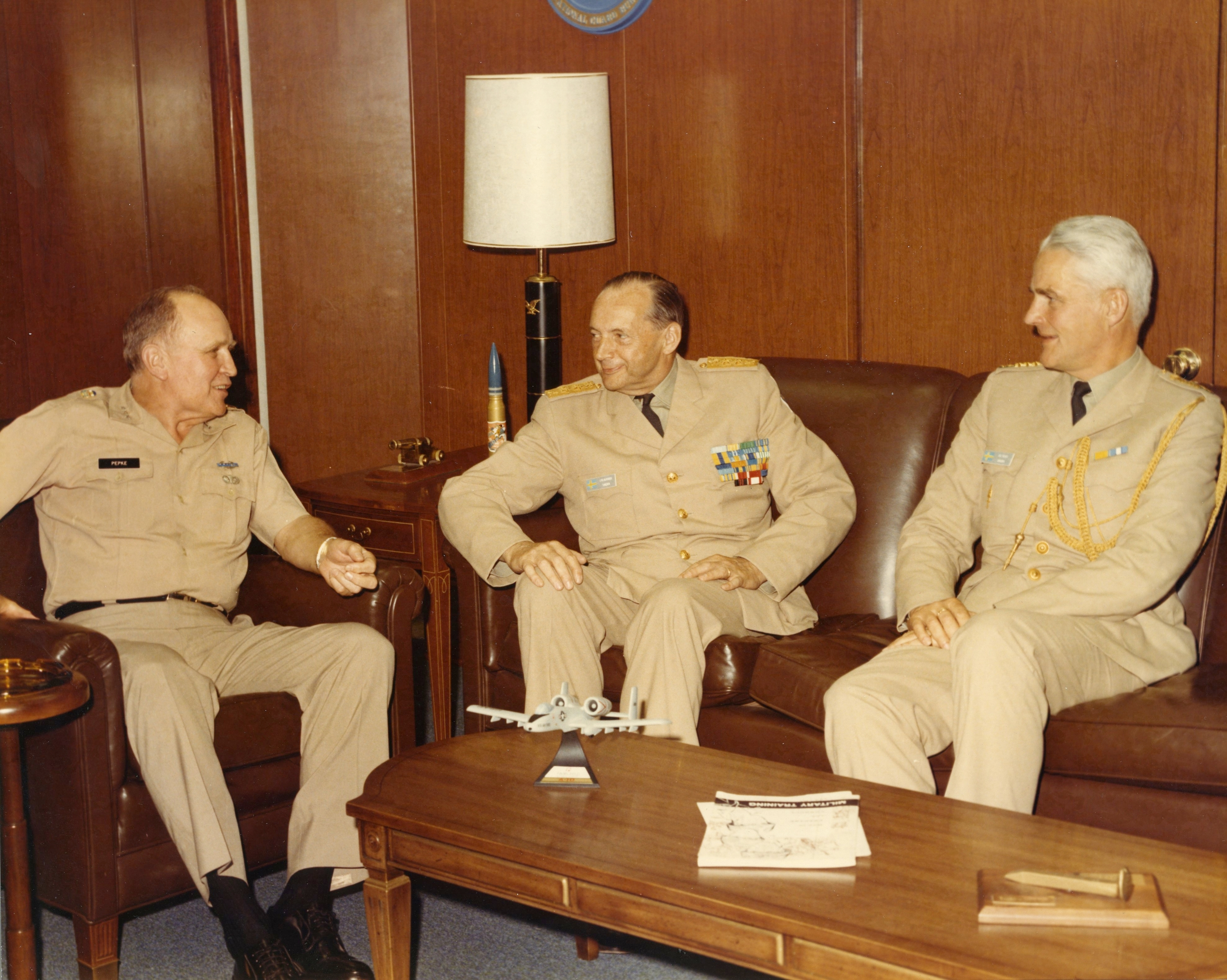
- Pepke (left) with Lieutenant General Carl Eric Almgren (middle) and Colonel Sten Geijer in 1975.
- Born: 17 September 1916; Minot, North Dakota
- Died: 15 January 1995 (aged 78); Williamsburg Community Hospital
- Burial place: Arlington National Cemetery
- Military career
- Allegiance: United States
- Branch: United States Army
- Service years: 1939–1975
- Rank: Lieutenant general
- Commands: 4th Infantry Division; 20th Infantry Regiment; 63rd Infantry Regiment
- Conflicts: World War II; Vietnam War
- Awards: Distinguished Service Medal (2); Silver Star; Legion of Merit (2); Purple Heart; Bronze Star; Air Medal (11)

Lieutenant General Donn Royce Pepke (7 September 1916 – 15 January 1995) was a United States Army officer who served in World War II and the Vietnam War.

== Early life ==
He was born in Minot, North Dakota on 7 September 1916.

== Military career ==
He was commissioned as a Second lieutenant in 1939.

He commanded the 2nd Battalion, 63rd Infantry Regiment in the Pacific Theater. In January 1944, at the age of 27, he assumed command of the Regiment becoming one of the youngest U.S. regimental commanders of World War II.

After the war he commanded the 20th Infantry Regiment in South Korea before returning to the U.S. to teach at Fort Belvoir. In 1950 he was assigned to West Germany and then served at the United States Army Infantry School at Fort Benning.

He later served as senior adviser to the 20th and 8th Divisions of the Republic of Korea Army (ROKA) and then as senior adviser for logistics to the ROKA. He served as Chief of Staff, 1st Armored Division from 1962 to 1963. In 1964 he was appointed Deputy Commanding General, Infantry Training Center, Fort Gordon. From late 1965 he served as Deputy Director of Strategic Plans & Policy and then as Director of Plans at The Pentagon.

On 30 November 1968 he became Commanding General, 4th Infantry Division in the Central Highlands of South Vietnam. On 6 October 1969 he directed the consolidation of all of the Division’s Long Range Reconnaissance Patrol platoons into Company K, (Ranger), 75th Infantry Regiment. On 14 November 1969 he was succeeded in command by Major-general Glenn D. Walker. Writing in November 1970 in the Military Review he characterized the Division’s operations as a successful economy of force mission.

Following his return from South Vietnam he served as Deputy Chief of Staff (Training), Continental Army Command from 1969 to 1971. He then served as Chief of Staff, Continental Army Command from 1971 to 1973. His final command was as Deputy Commanding General, Army Forces Command from 1973 to 1975. He retired from the U.S. Army in June 1975.

== Later life ==
He died on 15 January 1995 at Williamsburg Community Hospital and was buried at Arlington National Cemetery.

== Decorations ==
His decorations include Distinguished Service Medal, Silver Star, Legion of Merit (2), Purple Heart, Bronze Star and Air Medal (11).
