= Charles D. Franklin =

United States Army general

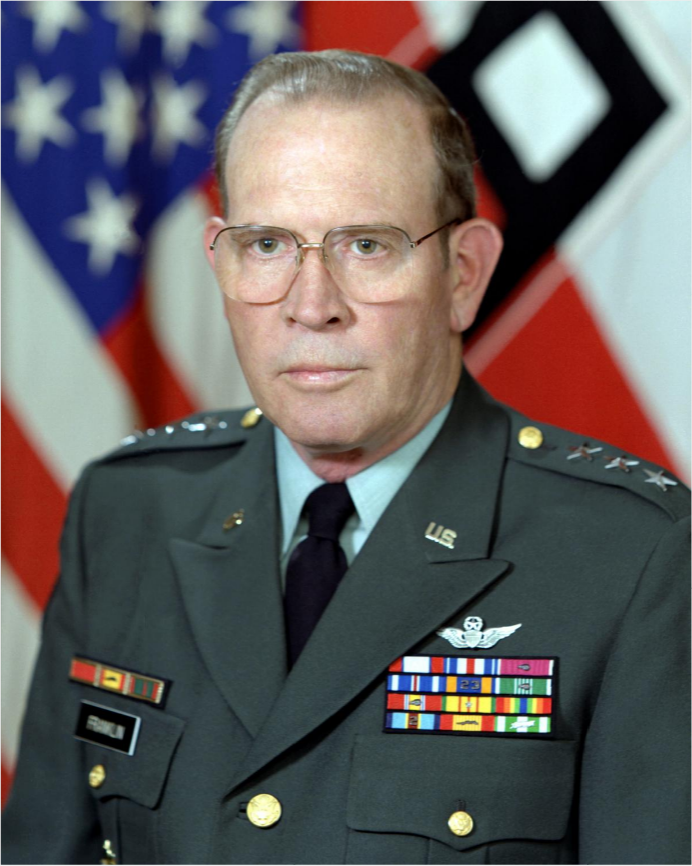
- Franklin as commander of the First United States Army in September 1984
- Born: December 11, 1931; Hugo, Missouri, US
- Died: March 16, 1992 (aged 60); Falls Church, Virginia, US
- Burial place: Arlington National Cemetery
- Military career
- Allegiance: United States
- Branch: United States Army
- Service years: 1953–1987
- Rank: Lieutenant General
- Commands: First United States Army; 9th Infantry Division Artillery; 2nd Battalion, 20th Field Artillery
- Conflicts: Korean War; Vietnam War
- Awards: Army Distinguished Service Medal (2); Silver Star; Legion of Merit (2); Distinguished Flying Cross; Air Medal (23); Army Commendation Medal (2)

Charles D. Franklin (December 11, 1931 – March 16, 1992) was an officer in the United States Army who retired as a lieutenant general.

== Early life ==
Charles Dale Franklin was born in Hugo, Missouri on December 11, 1931, the son of Jewell Franklin and Ethel (Shipman) Franklin. He graduated from the University of Missouri in 1953 with a degree in agriculture and received his second lieutenant's commission in the Field Artillery through the Reserve Officers' Training Corps.

== Military career ==
Franklin graduated from the Field Artillery Officer Basic Course in 1953, and then served with the 1st Cavalry Division during the Korean War. He completed the Artillery Officer Advanced Course in 1959. In 1962, he graduated from the United States Army Command and General Staff College. He graduated from the United States Army War College in 1970.

Franklin's assignments included tours in Vietnam during the Vietnam War; he commanded first the 116th Attack Helicopter Company, 269th Combat Aviation Battalion, 25th Infantry Division, and later the 2nd Battalion, 20th Field Artillery, 1st Cavalry Division. He served as commander of the 9th Infantry Division Artillery, chief of staff of the 9th Infantry Division, and deputy chief and chief of legislative liaison in the office of the Secretary of the Army. In 1984 he succeeded Donald E. Rosenblum as commander of the First United States Army at Fort Meade, Maryland. He was succeeded in this post by James E. Thompson Jr. and retired in 1987.

== Awards and decorations ==
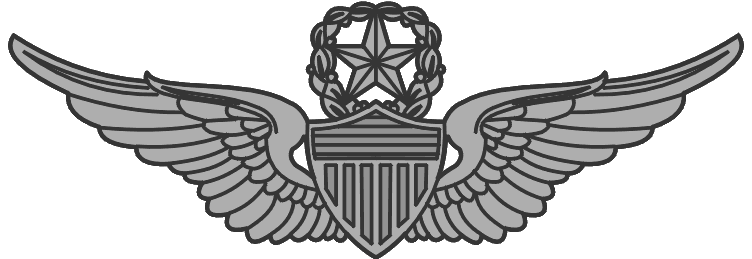
Master Army Aviator Badge
Army Staff Identification Badge

Army Distinguished Service Medal with one bronze oak leaf cluster
Silver Star
Legion of Merit with oak leaf cluster
Distinguished Flying Cross
Air Medal with Award numerals "23"
Army Commendation Medal with oak leaf cluster
Meritorious Unit Commendation
National Defense Service Medal with oak leaf cluster
Vietnam Service Medal with silver service star
Army Service Ribbon
Army Overseas Service Ribbon with bronze award numeral 2
Vietnam Gallantry Cross with palm
Vietnam Gallantry Cross Unit Citation
Vietnam Civil Actions Medal Unit Citation
Vietnam Campaign Medal

== Additional honors ==
In 1989, Franklin received the honorary degree of Legum Doctor from the University of Missouri.

== Death and burial ==
Franklin died of heart ailments at Fairfax Hospital in Falls Church, Virginia on March 16, 1992. He was buried at Arlington National Cemetery, Section 30, Grave 246-RH. Survivors included his wife, Pat and three children, Charles, Debby, and Susan.

== Sources ==
=== Newspapers ===
- "Captain C. D. Franklin Completes Course". Sunday News and Tribune. Jefferson, MO. July 1, 1962. p. 20.
- "Mid-Missourians in America's Armed Services". Daily Capital News. Jefferson City, MO. October 9, 1969. p. 10.
- "Charles Franklin Dies at 60". Washington Post. Washington, DC. March 18, 1992.
- "Obituary, Charles D. Franklin". Springfield News-Leader. Springfield, MO. March 19, 1992. p. 12.

=== Internet ===
- "Burial record, Charles D. Franklin". Arlington National Cemetery. United States Department of the Army. Archived from the original on July 22, 2011.
- "University of Missouri Honorary Degrees". Archives of the University of Missouri. Columbia, MO: University of Missouri.
- Detra, Dick. "The 269th Combat Aviation Battalion". VHPA Museum. Grand Prairie, TX: Vietnam Helicopter Pilots Association. p. 7.
- "Decorated; Silver Star". Tropic Lightning News. Flourtown, PA: 25th Infantry Division Association. January 29, 1968.

=== Books ===
- U.S. Army Register. Vol. 1. Washington, DC: US Government Printing Office. 1966. p. 193.
- Army Executive Biographies. Washington, DC: US Department of the Army. 1985. p. 51.

=== Magazines ===
- "Commanders Update" (PDF). Field Artillery Journal. Ft. Sill, OK: Field Artillery School. January 1, 1976. p. 59. Archived (PDF) from the original on December 31, 2016.
