= First Army (United States) =

Field army of the United States Army

- Shoulder sleeve insignia and combat service identification badge of the First United States Army.
- Active: 10 August 1918–20 April 1919; 1 October 1933–present
- Country: United States of America
- Branch: United States Army
- Type: Security operations
- Role: Training support
- Size: Theater Army
- Part of: U.S. Army Western Hemisphere Command
- Garrison/HQ: Rock Island Arsenal; Rock Island County, Illinois, U.S.
- Nickname: Doughboys
- Motto: First in Deed
- Anniversaries: 10 August 1918
- Engagements: World War I; St. Mihiel; Meuse-Argonne; Lorraine 1918; World War II; Normandy; Northern France; Rhineland; Ardennes-Alsace; Central Europe
- Website: first.army.mil

Commanders
- Commanding General: LTG Monte L. Rone
- Deputy Commanding General (Operations): MG Eric J. Riley
- Deputy Commanding General (Support): MG Richard Corner II
- Command Sergeant Major: CSM Christopher A. Prosser
- Notable commanders: John J. Pershing; Omar Bradley; Courtney Hodges; Russel L. Honoré

Insignia
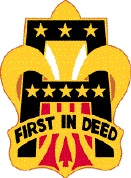
- Distinctive unit insignia

- Flag

First Army is the oldest and longest-established field army of the United States Army. It served as a regular army, having seen service in both World War I and World War II, and supplied the US army with soldiers and equipment during the Korean War and the Vietnam War under some of the most famous and distinguished officers of the U.S. Army. It now serves as a mobilization, readiness and training command.

== History ==
=== Establishment and World War I ===
The First Army was established on 10 August 1918 as a field army when sufficient American military manpower had arrived on the Western Front during the final months of World War I. The large number of troops assigned to the American Expeditionary Forces (AEF) required the activation of subordinate commands. To fill the need, First Army was the first of three field armies established under the AEF. The first commander was General John J. Pershing, who also served as Commander-in-Chief of the AEF. The headquarters planned and coordinated the first major American offensive, the St Mihiel Offensive (September 12 to 16, 1918). It went on to fight in the largest and deadliest battle in the United States Army's history, the Meuse–Argonne offensive. Serving in its ranks throughout World War I were commanders who later were important in World War II. First Army, then later under Lieutenant General Hunter Liggett, was inactivated on April 20, 1919, five months after the Armistice with Germany which ended hostilities.

=== Inter-war years ===
As part of the realization of the 1920 amendment to the National Defense Act of 1916, the Army Chief of Staff, General Douglas MacArthur, directed the establishment of six field armies that each commanded three corps areas that were geographically located. The "First Army Area" (First, Second, and Third Corps Areas) contained the First and Fourth Armies, the "Second Army Area" (Fourth, Fifth, and Sixth Corps Areas) contained the Second and Fifth Armies, and the "Third Army Area" (Seventh, Eighth, and Ninth Corps Areas) contained the Third and Sixth Armies. Between 1921 and 1932, the six field armies were constituted in the Organized Reserve rather than in the Regular Army, as the War Department did not see a need for active-duty field army headquarters in peacetime. The Headquarters and Headquarters Company, First Army, was originally constituted in the Organized Reserve on 15 October 1921 and allotted to the Second Corps Area. The headquarters was initiated on 28 August 1924 at New York City, New York. In August 1927, the War Department realized it would need at least one active-duty field army, in command of three corps, in case of any contingencies, and so the First Army was withdrawn from the Organized Reserve on 15 August 1927 and demobilized.

A new field army, designated Headquarters and Headquarters Company, Seventh Army, was constituted in the Regular Army on 15 August 1927 and allotted to the Second Corps Area in place of First Army. It was redesignated Headquarters and Headquarters Company, First Army on 13 October 1927. Headquarters, First Army, was activated on 8 September 1932 at Governor’s Island, New York, and assumed control over the First, Second, and Third Corps Areas. The First Corps Area was headquartered in Boston, Massachusetts, Second Corps Area was headquartered at Fort Jay, on Governors Island in New York Harbor, and Third Corps Area headquarters was at Fort Howard near Baltimore, Maryland. The overall mission of First Army was commanding and training the Regular Army, National Guard, and Organized Reserve units in its three corps areas.

First Army's first commander, from 1932 to 1936, was Major General Dennis E. Nolan, who had been the American Expeditionary Force's (AEF) chief of intelligence during World War I. He was followed by Major General Fox Conner, previously First Corps Area commander, who had been the AEF's Chief of Operations in World War I. In the years between the wars, Conner was a crucial mentor in the careers of Dwight Eisenhower and George C. Marshall. Passed over as a candidate for Army Chief of Staff for Douglas MacArthur in 1930, Conner was assigned to command the First Corps Area instead, later commanding First Army in 1936. Conner retired in 1938.

In 1938, First Army came under command of General Hugh A. Drum. Drum began to develop the First Army into a bona fide field army with the expansion of the Army in 1939 and through the early 1940s. It began to establish and develop its own staff and participated in the large-scale Army maneuvers in Louisiana and North Carolina between 1939 and 1941.

=== World War II ===
As the United States entered World War II, Drum was assigned command of the newly established Eastern Defense Command, responsible for coastal and domestic defense, which relieved the First Army of this responsibility on 24 December 1942. Drum retired in 1943 when he reached the mandatory retirement age. General George Grunert, commander of the Second Service Command, assumed command of the First Army until Headquarters, First Army was activated in Bristol, England in January 1944 under the command of General Omar Bradley.

First Army's entry into World War II began in October 1943 as General Bradley returned to Washington, D.C., to receive his command and began to assemble a staff and headquarters to prepare for Operation Overlord, the codename assigned to the establishment of a large-scale lodgement on the European Continent following Operation Neptune, which was the invasion of Normandy. The headquarters were activated in January 1944 at Bristol, England.

The second iteration of the First Army as constituted in the Regular Army after World War I did not continue the lineage of the World War I-era First Army; on 27 June 1944, the World War I-era First Army was reconstituted in the Regular Army as Headquarters and Headquarters Company, First Army, and was consolidated with the active Headquarters and Headquarters Company, First Army. Upon going ashore on 6 June 1944, D-Day, First Army came under General Bernard Montgomery's 21st Army Group (alongside the British Second Army) which commanded all American ground forces during the invasion. Three American divisions were landed by sea at the western end of the beaches, and two more were landed by air. On Utah Beach, the assault troops of VII Corps made good progress, but V Corps on Omaha Beach came nearest of all of the five landing areas to disaster. The two American airborne divisions that landed, the 82nd and 101st, were scattered all over the landscape, and caused considerable confusion among the German soldiers, as well as largely securing their objectives, albeit with units completely mixed up with each other. First Army captured much of the early gains of the Allied forces in Normandy. Once the beachheads were linked together, its troops struck west and isolated the Cotentin Peninsula, and then captured Cherbourg. When the American Mulberry harbour was wrecked by a storm, Cherbourg became even more vital.

After the capture of Cherbourg, First Army struck south. In Operation Cobra, its forces finally managed to break through the German lines. The newly established Third Army was then fed through the gap and raced across France.

With the arrival of more US troops in France, the Army then passed from the control of the 21st Army Group to the newly arrived 12th Army Group which commanded the First Army and the newly formed Third Army under Lieutenant General George S. Patton. General Bradley assumed command of the 12th Army Group and Lieutenant General Courtney Hodges was placed in command of the First Army. First Army followed Third Army, the American armies forming the southern part of the encirclement of Germans at the Falaise pocket.

After capturing Paris (the Wehrmachtbefehlshaber von Groß-Paris, Dietrich von Choltitz, capitulated 25 August, ignoring Hitler's Trümmerfeldbefehl), During the Battle of the Mons Pocket VII Corps took approximately 25,000 prisoners. First Army headed towards the south of the Netherlands. First Army liberated most of Luxembourg in three days from 9–12 September 1944.

When the Germans attacked during the Battle of the Bulge, First Army found itself on the north side of the salient, and thus isolated from 12th Army Group, its commanding authority. It was, therefore, temporarily transferred, along with Ninth Army, back to 21st Army Group under Montgomery on 20 December. The salient was reduced by early February 1945. Following the Battle of the Bulge, the Rhineland Campaign began, and First Army was transferred back to 12th Army Group. In Operation Lumberjack, First Army closed up to the lower Rhine by 5 March, and the higher parts of the river five days later.

On 7 March, in a stroke of luck, Company A, 27th Armored Infantry Battalion, part of Combat Command B, 9th Armored Division, found the Ludendorff Bridge across the Rhine at Remagen still standing. It quickly captured the bridge and established a secure bridgehead. in the next 15 days, over 25,000 troops and their equipment crossed the river. By 4 April, an enormous pocket had been created by First Army and Ninth Army, which contained the German Army Group B under Field Marshal Model, the last significant combat force in the northwest of Germany. While some elements of First Army concentrated on reducing the Ruhr pocket, others headed further east, creating another pocket containing the German Eleventh Army. First Army reached the Elbe by 18 April. There the advance halted, as that was the agreed demarcation zone between the American and Soviet forces. First Army and Soviet forces met on 25 April.

In May 1945, advance elements of First Army headquarters had returned to New York City and were preparing to redeploy to the Pacific theater of the war to prepare for Operation Coronet, the planned second phase of Operation Downfall the proposed invasion of Honshū, the main island of Japan in the spring of 1946, but the Japanese surrender in August 1945 thanks to the atomic bombings of Hiroshima and Nagasaki terminated that effort.

=== Post-war and peacetime missions ===
First Army returned to the United States in late 1945; first to Fort Jackson (South Carolina), then to Fort Bragg, North Carolina. It was then reformed again by "reflagging" Headquarters, Second Service Command at Fort Jay, Governors Island, New York, in the spring of 1946. Technically Second Service Command and First Army had no lineage connection: actually, Headquarters, Second Service Command, became Headquarters, First Army. It became responsible for Army Reserve and National Guard supervision in a number of states in the Northeast.

RC supervising corps included:

- II Corps (United States), March 1958 until it was inactivated on 5 June 1970. Its headquarters was initially established at Camp Kilmer, New Jersey (1958), then subsequently moved to Fort Wadsworth, Staten Island, New York. It was responsible for the Mid-Atlantic sector of First Army, primarily covering New York and New Jersey.
- XIII Corps (United States), Late 1950s until its inactivation on 5 January 1970. Its headquarters was at Fort Devens, Massachusetts. It was responsible for all six New England states.

Twenty years later, in 1966, First Army relocated to Fort George G. Meade, Maryland, and took over, in addition to its ongoing original tasks, the responsibilities of Second Army, which was inactivated. In 1973, First Army's mission changed from training and preparation of active units to Army Reserve units. That year it gained the Support Group in Puerto Rico. In a 1993 reorganization, five divisions carried out that training and support mission:

75th Division, Houston, Texas
78th "Lightning" Division, Edison, New Jersey
85th "Custer" Division, Arlington Heights, Illinois
87th "Golden Acorn" Division, Birmingham, Alabama
91st "Wild West" Division, Dublin, California

In 1993, Headquarters First Army relocated to Fort Gillem, near Atlanta, Georgia, and became responsible for the training and mobilization of all Army Reserve and National Guard units in the United States and providing assistance to the civilian sector during national emergencies and natural disasters. In the latter role, First Army's contributions during the 2005 Hurricane Katrina disaster was a rare bright spot in leading federal relief efforts in the aftermath of the storm. Its commander, Russel L. Honoré, a Louisiana native, became a nationally recognized figure in his direct, no-nonsense approach to disaster relief which earned First Army a Joint Meritorious Unit Award.

In the 21st century, First Army was subjected to more changes as base closures and force structures were instituted to modernize, economize and change its mission. In 2005, a Base Realignment and Closure (BRAC) Commission decision called for the relocation of First Army headquarters to Rock Island Arsenal, Illinois, in 2011. Its former quarters at Fort Gillem was to transition to a single national location for the mobilization and demobilization of Army National Guard and Reserve units.

In a second change, as part of the 2006 reorganization of the United States Army program, First Army exchanged its civilian assistance mission for the training and support missions for military units in the western United States formerly held by US Fifth Army. Fifth Army then became U.S. Army, North with responsibilities for homeland defense and domestic emergency assistance.

First Army inactivated its training divisions and reactivated them as separate training brigades under two commands. First Army Division East, headquartered at Fort Knox, Kentucky (relocated from Fort Meade, Maryland in 2016), has responsibilities in all states east of the Mississippi River; and First Army Division West assuming Fifth Army's role and relocating from Fort Carson to its new headquarters at Fort Hood, Texas, oversees units in all states west of the Mississippi River.

First United States Army was redesignated as First Army on 3 October 2006.

== Heraldic items ==
=== Shoulder sleeve insignia ===
- Description: On a background equally divided horizontally white and red, 3 1/4 inches high and 2 1/2 inches wide at base and 2 1/8 inches wide at top, a black block letter "A", 2 3/4 inches high, 2 inches wide at base and 1 5/8 inches wide at top, all members 7/16 inch wide, all enclosed within a 1/8 inch Army Green border.
- Symbolism:
1. The red and white of the background are the colors used in flags for Armies.
2. The letter "A" represents "Army" and is also the first letter of the alphabet suggesting "First Army."
- Background:

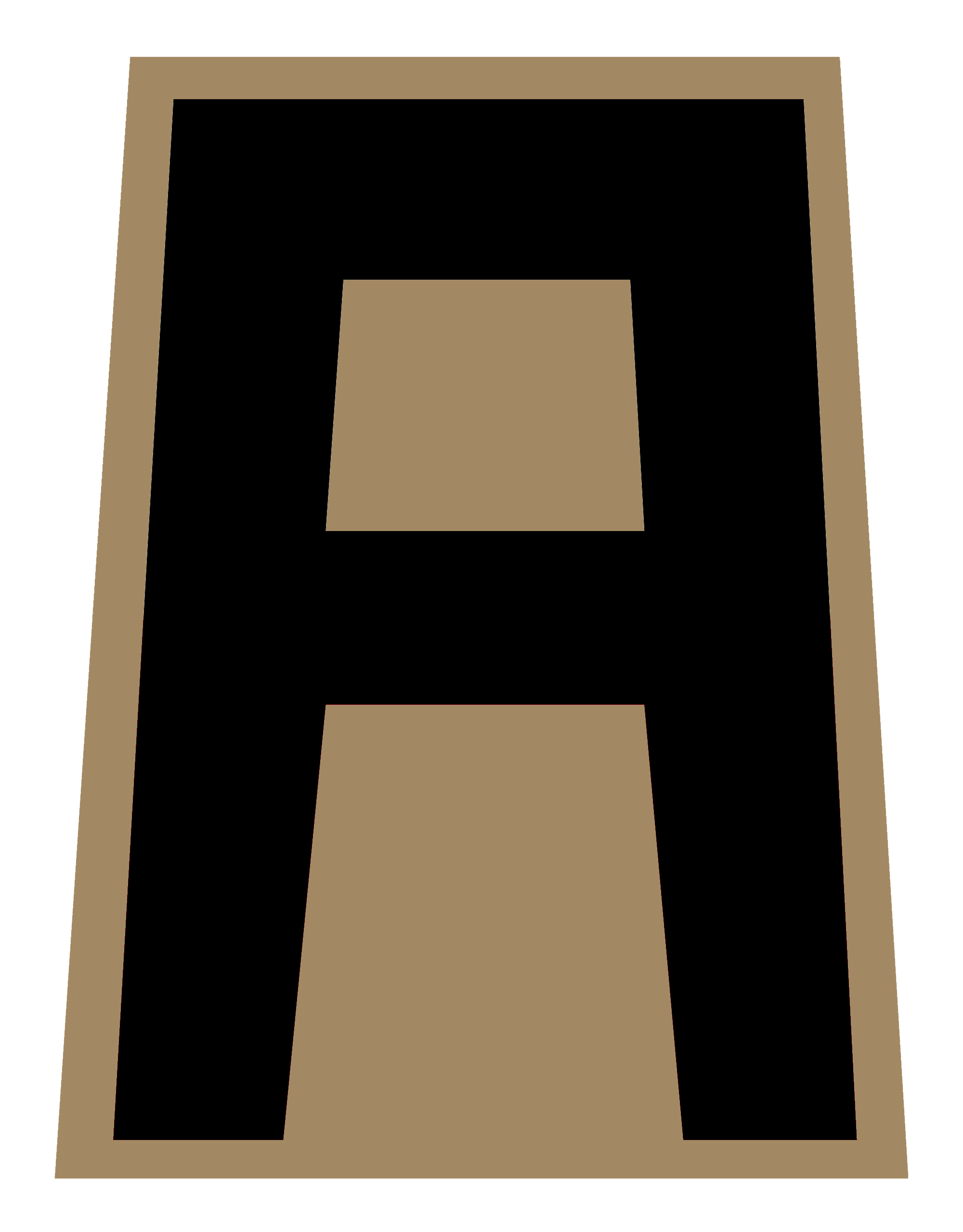
US Army 1st Army Shoulder Sleeve Insignia Prior to 1950 red and white background

1. A black letter "A" was approved as the authorized insignia by the Commanding General, American Expedition Force, on 16 November 1918 and approved by the War Department on 5 May 1922.
2. The background was added on 17 November 1950.

=== Insignia ===
- Description:
1. A gold color metal and enamel device 1 1/4 inches high overall consisting of a black enamel capital letter "A" bearing three gold stars on the top cross bar and five gold on the center cross bar, in front of and interlaced with a gold fleur-de-lis.
2. The vertical petal is charged in base with a red enamel arrowhead behind and extending above the letter "A" and the tops of the two outside or flanking petals above the cross bar extending over the vertical legs of the letter "A".
3. The lower ends of the outside petals curve under and over the lower ends of the vertical legs of the letter "A" and are joined by a gold arched scroll inscribed "First In Deed" in black enamel letters.
4. The areas within the letter "A" above the center cross bar are white enamel and the areas below the cross bar are red enamel.
- Symbolism:
1. The basic design was suggested by the authorized shoulder sleeve insignia of the First Army.
2. The Interlaced fleur-de-lis represent wartime service in France and alludes to the initial organization of the Headquarters Company as the Headquarters Troop, First Army at La Ferte-sous-Jouarre, France 10 August 1918.
3. The three stars at the top of the letter "A" are for Lorraine 1918, St. Mihiel and Meuse-Argonne campaigns in which the First Army participated in World War I.
4. The five stars on the center cross bar are for the Normandy, Northern France, Rhineland, Ardennes-Alsace and Central Europe campaigns in which the First Army participated in World War II, the red arrowhead referring to the assault landing on the Normandy beaches.
5. The motto "First In Deed" is based on the numerical designation, purpose and achievements of the First United States Army.
- Background: The insignia was approved on 27 January 1969.

== Lineage ==
- The First United States Army was organized on 10 August 1918 in the Regular Army in France as Headquarters and Headquarters Troop, First Army.
- Headquarters Troop was reorganized and redesignated in September 1918 as Troop A, Headquarters Battalion, First Army. It saw action in the American Expeditionary Force in the latter stages of World War I and included many figures who were later to become very famous, such as Douglas MacArthur.
- Troop A, Headquarters Battalion, First Army was redesignated on 1 March 1919, as Headquarters Troop, First Army, and Headquarters and Headquarters Troop, First Army, demobilized on 20 April 1919 in France.
- First Army was Constituted 15 August 1927 in the Regular Army as Headquarters and Headquarters Company, Seventh Army, but was Redesignated 13 October 1927 as Headquarters and Headquarters Company, First Army.
- Headquarters, First Army activated 1 October 1933 at Fort Jay, Governors Island, New York. It had the mission of training Army formations at the time, as did all the other field armies.
- Headquarters Company activated 18 November 1940 at Fort Jay, Governors Island, New York.
- October 1943, Headquarters First Army relocated from Fort Jay, Governors Island, New York to Bristol, England in anticipation of Normandy invasion.
- A separate First Army was Reconstituted on 27 June 1944 in the Regular Army as Headquarters and Headquarters Company, First Army; concurrently consolidated with the original Headquarters and Headquarters Company, First Army. The consolidated unit designated as Headquarters and Headquarters Company, First Army.
- First Army Headquarters returns to Fort Jay, Governors Island, New York in 1946.
- First Army was Redesignated 1 January 1957 as Headquarters and Headquarters Company, First United States Army.
- Merger of First and Second Army, relocation of headquarters to Fort Meade and closure of Fort Jay, Governors Island, New York announced 20 November 1964.
- 1 January 1966, the First and Second U.S. Armies merged and First Army headquarters moved to Fort Meade, Maryland.
- Headquarters Company inactivated 5 June 1970 at Fort George G. Meade, Maryland, while Headquarters, First U.S. Army continued to function.
- In 1973 the First Army again changed its orientation to improving the readiness of the Reserve Components.
- In 1993, First Army headquarters was moved to Fort Gillem, Georgia (the former Atlanta Army Depot).
- In 2005, First Army is awarded a Joint Meritorious Unit Award for leading federal response to Hurricane Katrina.
- In 2006, it was announced that subject to Base Realignment and Closure Act, Fort Gillem would eventually be closed and First Army headquarters relocated to Rock Island Arsenal Illinois.
- 1 December 2006, First Army reorganizes and reflags its five Reserve Component Training Support Divisions into 16 training brigades and establishes two sub-commands, First Army Division East and First Army Division West. First Army East at Fort Meade, Maryland administers eight brigades east of the Mississippi River and First Army West at Fort Hood, Texas, assumes the training responsibilities with eight brigades formerly held by U.S. Fifth Army. Fifth Army becomes U.S. Army, North, and assumes First Army's domestic assistance duties.
- 6 July 2026 First Army deactivates the East and West Divisions and returns responsibility for subordinate units to First Army.

== First U.S. Army honors ==
=== Campaign participation credit ===
Conflict	Streamer	Year(s)
World War I	St. Mihiel	1918
World War I	Meuse-Argonne	1918
World War I	Lorraine 1918	1918
World War II	Normandy (with arrowhead)	1944
World War II	Northern France	1944
World War II	Rhineland	1945
World War II	Ardennes-Alsace	1944–1945
World War II	Central Europe	1945

=== Decorations ===
Ribbon	Award	Year	Orders
	Joint Meritorious Unit Award	2005	For leading the federal response to Hurricane Katrina 2005.
	Army Superior Unit Award	2001–2004	Lineage & Honors Statement; 30 April 2012
	Army Superior Unit Award	2004–2008	Permanent Orders 120-10; 30 April 2009
	Army Superior Unit Award	2008–2011	Permanent Orders 332-07 announcing award of the Army Superior Unit award

== Structure in the mid-2020s ==
On order, First Army expands to nine Mobilization force generation installations (MFGI) to mobilize the Reserve component of the US Army. The Army Reserve mobilizes Focused readiness units (FRU) to meet Operational plan (OPLAN) requirements of the combatant commander (CCDR).

Headquarters First Army is located at Rock Island Arsenal, Illinois.

Its units include:

- 4th "Saber" Cavalry Brigade – Fort Knox, Kentucky. Formerly the 85th Division's 4th Brigade
- 157th "Spartan" Infantry Brigade – Camp Atterbury, Indiana. Formerly the 87th Division's 5th Brigade.
- 174th "Patriot" Infantry Brigade – Fort Dix (Joint Base McGuire-Dix-Lakehurst), New Jersey. Formerly the 78th Division's 2nd Brigade.
- 177th "Spear Head" Armored Brigade – Camp Shelby, Mississippi. Formerly the 87th Division's 3rd Brigade.
- 181st "Eagle" Infantry Brigade – Fort McCoy, Wisconsin. Formerly the 85th Division's 2nd Brigade.
- 188th "Battle Ready" Infantry Brigade – Fort Stewart, Georgia. Formerly the 87th Division's 4th Brigade.
- 189th "Bayonet" Infantry Brigade – Joint Base Lewis-McChord, Washington. Formerly the 78th Division's 4th Brigade.
- 5th Armored Brigade – Fort Bliss, Texas. Formerly the 91st Division's 2nd Brigade.
- 120th Infantry Brigade – Fort Hood, Texas. Formerly the 75th Division's 2nd Brigade.
- 166th Aviation Brigade - Fort Hood, Texas
- 85th "Custer" Army Reserve Support Command (West) - Arlington Heights, Illinois. Formerly the 85th Division

== List of commanders ==
- GEN John J. Pershing 1918
- MG Hunter Liggett 1918–1919
- MG Dennis E. Nolan 1932–1936
- MG Fox Conner 1936–1938
- MG Frank Ross McCoy 1938 (interim)
- MG James K. Parsons 1938 (interim)
- LTG Hugh A. Drum 1938–1943
- LTG George Grunert 1943-1944
- LTG Omar N. Bradley 1944
- GEN Courtney H. Hodges 1944–1949
- MG Roscoe B. Woodruff 1949 (interim)
- GEN Walter Bedell Smith 1949–1950
- MG Roscoe B. Woodruff 1950 (interim)
- LTG Willis D. Crittenberger 1950–1952
- LTG Withers A. Burress 1953–1954
- LTG Thomas W. Herren 1954–1957
- LTG Blackshear M. Bryan 1957–1960
- LTG Edward J. O'Neill 1960–1962
- LTG Garrison H. Davidson 1962–1964
- LTG Robert W. Porter Jr. 1964–1965
- LTG Thomas W. Dunn 1965
- LTG William F. Train 1966–1967
- LTG Jonathan O. Seaman 1967–1971
- LTG Claire E. Hutchin Jr. 1971–1973
- LTG Glenn D. Walker 1973–1974
- LTG James G. Kalergis 1974–1975
- LTG Jeffrey G. Smith 1975–1979
- LTG John F. Forrest 1979–1981
- LTG Donald E. Rosenblum 1981–1984
- LTG Charles D. Franklin 1984–1987
- LTG James E. Thompson Jr. 1987–1991
- LTG James H. Johnson Jr. 1991-1993
- LTG John P. Otjen 1993–1995
- LTG Guy A. J. LaBoa 1995–1997
- LTG George A. Fisher Jr. 1997–1999
- LTG John M. Riggs 1999–2001
- LTG Joseph R. Inge 2001–2004
- LTG Russel L. Honoré 2004–2008
- LTG Thomas G. Miller 2008–2011
- LTG John Michael Bednarek 2011–2013
- MG Kevin R. Wendel 2013 (interim)
- LTG Michael S. Tucker 2013–2016
- LTG Stephen M. Twitty 2016–2018
- MG Erik C. Peterson 2018 (acting)
- LTG Thomas S. James Jr. 2018–2021
- LTG Antonio A. Aguto Jr. 2021–2022
- MG Mark H. Landes 2023–2024 (acting)
- MG William A. Ryan III 2024 (interim)
- LTG Mark H. Landes 2024–2026
- MG Eric J. Riley 2026 (acting)
- LTG Monte L. Rone 2026–Present
