= First Army Division West =

- Shoulder sleeve insignia and combat service identification badge of the First United States Army
- Active: 7 March 2007 – 8 July 2026
- Country: United States
- Branch: United States Army
- Role: Training Support
- Size: Division
- Part of: First United States Army
- Garrison/HQ: Fort Hood, Texas
- Motto: First in the West
- Engagements: Operation Iraqi Freedom; Operation New Dawn; Operation Enduring Freedom; Horn of Africa; Kosovo

Commanders
- Current commander: MG Richard Corner II
- Command Sergeant Major: CSM Vincent Simonetti

Insignia
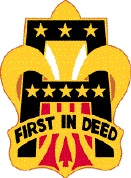
- Distinctive unit insignia

- Flag

The First Army Division West was a division of the First United States Army. With its new role, the First Army developed two subordinate multi-component headquarters – one division to support the western United States and the other to support the eastern United States. First Army Division East was activated at Fort Meade, Maryland. First Army Division West was activated on 7 March 2007, at Fort Carson, Colorado, and was transferred to its current headquarters at Fort Hood, Texas as part of the 4th Infantry Division realignment.

First Army Division West was established by the Department of the Army to provide training and readiness oversight and mobilization operations for an area of responsibility spanning the states and territories west of the Mississippi River. Division West partners with USAR and ARNG Leadership, during Pre, Post and De- Mobilization, to advise, assist and train Army formations, Individual Non-unit Replacements, and Department of the Army Civilians in a multi-component, integrated training environment to achieve Department of the Army directed readiness objectives enabling FORSCOM to provide Combatant Commanders trained and ready forces in support of worldwide requirements.

First Army Division East was deactivated 8 July 2026 at Rock Island Arsenal.

== Subordinate Commands ==
The division is organized into five brigades located throughout the western United States with 37 total battalions. The 85th Division provides trained Observer/Controllers to assist during collective training exercises and mobilizations.

5th Armored Brigade – Fort Bliss, Texas. Formerly the 91st Division's 2nd Brigade.
120th Infantry Brigade – Fort Hood, Texas. Formerly the 75th Division's 2nd Brigade.
166th Aviation Brigade - Fort Hood
, Texas
181st "Eagle" Infantry Brigade – Fort McCoy, Wisconsin. Formerly the 85th Division's 2nd Brigade.
189th "Bayonet" Infantry Brigade – Joint Base Lewis-McChord, Washington. Formerly the 78th Division's 4th Brigade.
85th "Custer" Army Reserve Support Command (West) - Arlington Heights, Illinois. Formerly the 85th Division

== Decorations ==
Ribbon	Award	Year	Orders
	Army Superior Unit Award	2008–2011	Permanent Orders 332-07 announcing award of the Army Superior Unit award
