= Claire E. Hutchin Jr. =

United States Army general

Claire Elwood Hutchin Jr
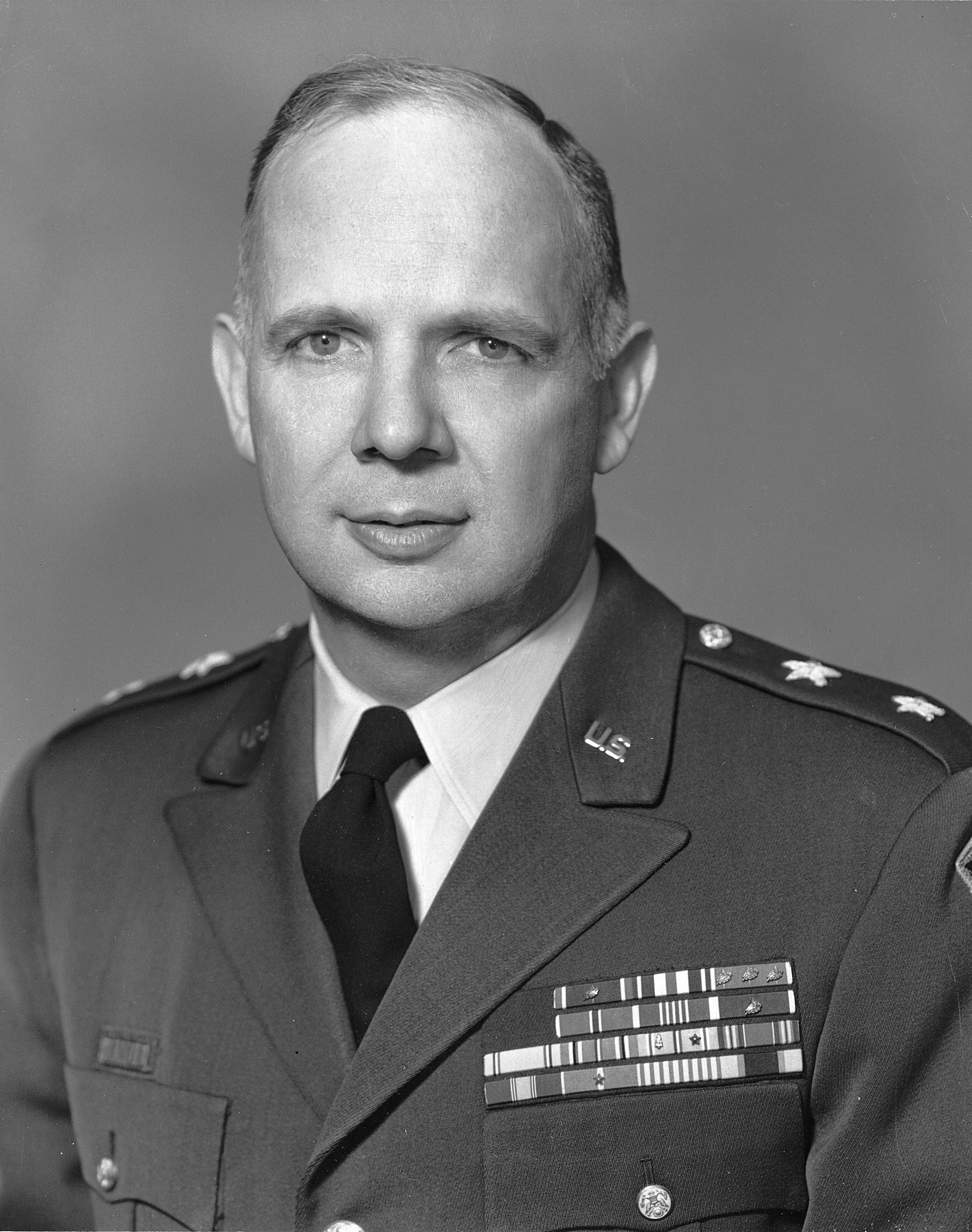
- Born: January 9, 1916; Washington, Illinois
- Died: June 22, 1980 (aged 64); Severna Park, Maryland
- Burial place: Arlington National Cemetery
- Military career
- Allegiance: United States
- Branch: United States Army
- Service years: 1938–1973
- Rank: Lieutenant General
- Commands: First United States Army; V Corps; 4th Infantry Division; 12th Infantry Regiment
- Conflicts: World War II; Korean War
- Awards: Distinguished Service Cross (2); Army Distinguished Service Medal (2); Silver Star; Legion of Merit (5); Bronze Star Medal; Army Commendation Medal; Purple Heart (2)

Claire Elwood Hutchin Jr. (January 9, 1916 – June 22, 1980) was a highly decorated lieutenant general in the United States Army. He received two Distinguished Service Crosses during the Korean War, and later commanded the 4th Infantry Division and First United States Army.

== Early life ==
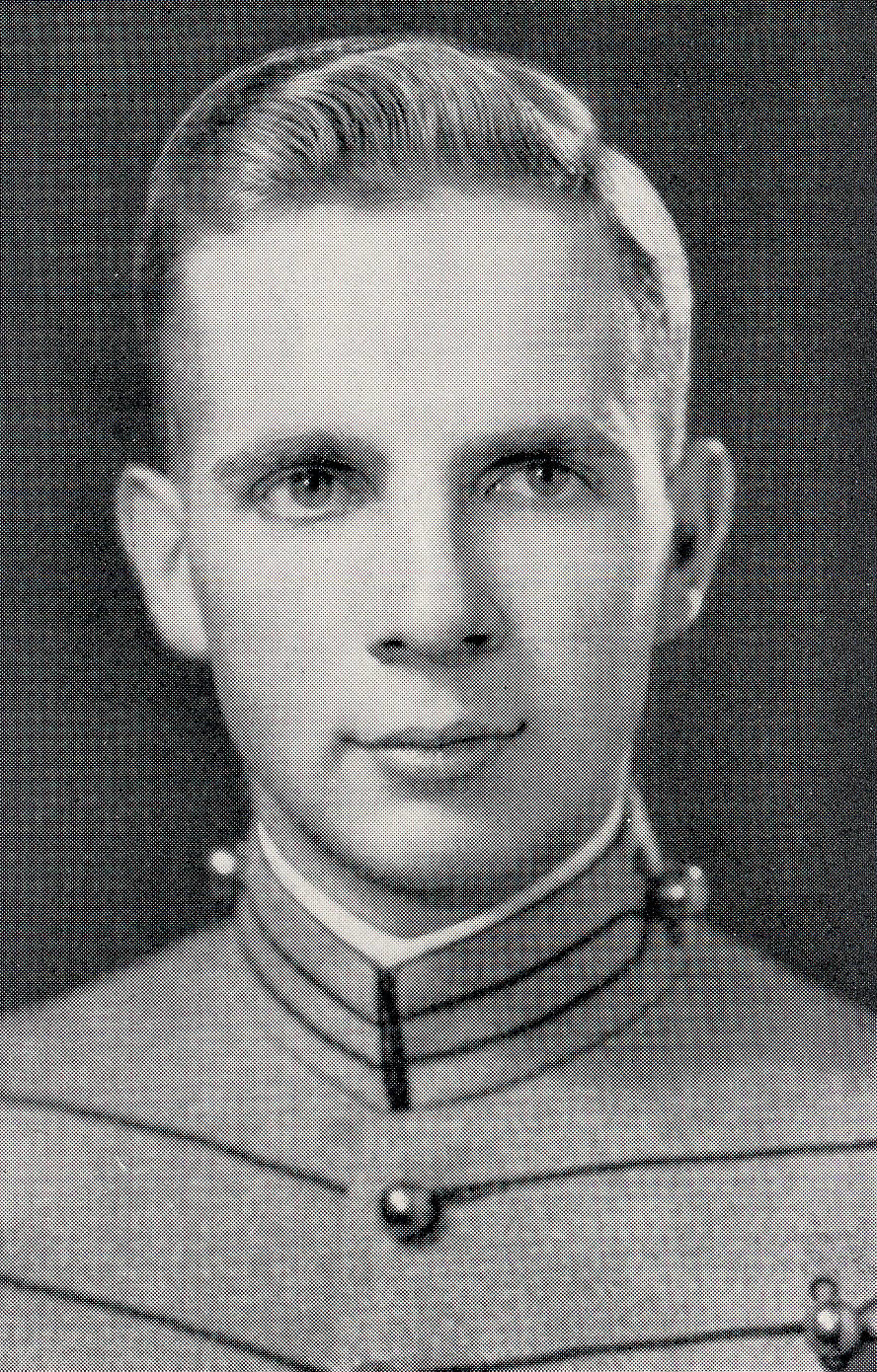
Hutchin as a United States Military Academy cadet c. 1938

Hutchin was born in Washington, Illinois, on January 9, 1916. He was named after his father, a lawyer who saw service in World War I.

== Military career ==
Hutchin was appointed to the United States Military Academy in 1934 from Washington state where his father was posted at Vancouver Barracks, Washington. He graduated with the class of 1938 and was commissioned a second lieutenant and assigned to the 29th Infantry Regiment at Fort Benning, Georgia, until July 1941.

=== World War II ===
At the time of the United States entry into World War II, Hutchin was assistant staff officer G1 (administration) for the 4th Infantry Division until attending the Command and General Staff School at Fort Leavenworth, Kansas in early 1942. In April, Hutchin became assistant G2 (intelligence) staff officer for the 7th Infantry Division, then at Fort Ord, California.

In 1943, Hutchin was assistant G3 (operations and plans) staff officer for IX Corps. Later that year he received a wartime commission as lieutenant colonel and posting with the Southeast Asia Command joint planning staff. After the war he transferred to the War Department general staff operations division strategy section. In November 1946, Hutchin was assistant executive officer for General George C. Marshall's special presidential mission to China. He returned to China as part of General Albert Coady Wedemeyer's presidential mission in late 1947. By the end of the year, Hutchin was joint secretary then joint planner with the Commander-in-Chief, Pacific (CINCPAC) joint staff.

=== Korean War ===
In the Korean War, Hutchin was awarded the Distinguished Service Cross for commanding the 1st Battalion, 23rd Infantry Regiment against the Chinese offensive from November 25–30, 1950, around Kujangdong, Korea. Hutchin was engaged in a series of defensive actions, counterattacks and withdrawals against superior enemy forces when his Company C, was overrun and suffered losses of combat leadership and material. Taking personal command, he recovered the disorganized elements of the company, recovered the unit's original position and relieved troops surrounded when the position was overrun.

Later, his battalion was assigned as the rear guard for the 2nd Infantry Division withdrawal from Kujangdong and fought two enemy battalions with a single rifle company and armored company.

=== Later career ===
As a major general, Hutchin commanded the 4th Infantry Division from September 1963 to June 1965.

From July 1967 to August 1969, Lieutenant General Hutchin was deputy commander/chief of staff for United States Pacific Command. From 1969 to 1971, Hutchin served as the Commanding General, V Corps in Frankfurt, Germany. Hutchin commanded the First United States Army at Fort Meade, Maryland from 1971 until his retirement in 1973. He was succeeded by Glenn D. Walker.

== Awards and decorations ==
| Combat Infantryman Badge with star |

| Distinguished Service Cross with oak leaf cluster |
| Army Distinguished Service Medal with oak leaf cluster |
| Silver Star |
| Legion of Merit with four oak leaf clusters |
| Bronze Star Medal |
| Army Commendation Medal |
| Purple Heart with oak leaf cluster |
| American Defense Service Medal |
| American Campaign Medal |
| Asiatic-Pacific Campaign Medal with one service star and Arrowhead device |
| World War II Victory Medal |
| Army of Occupation Medal |
| National Defense Service Medal with oak leaf cluster |
| Korean Service Medal with one service star |
| Order of the Cloud and Banner with Special Cravat (Taiwan) |
| United Nations Korea Medal |
