= Donald E. Rosenblum =

United States Army general

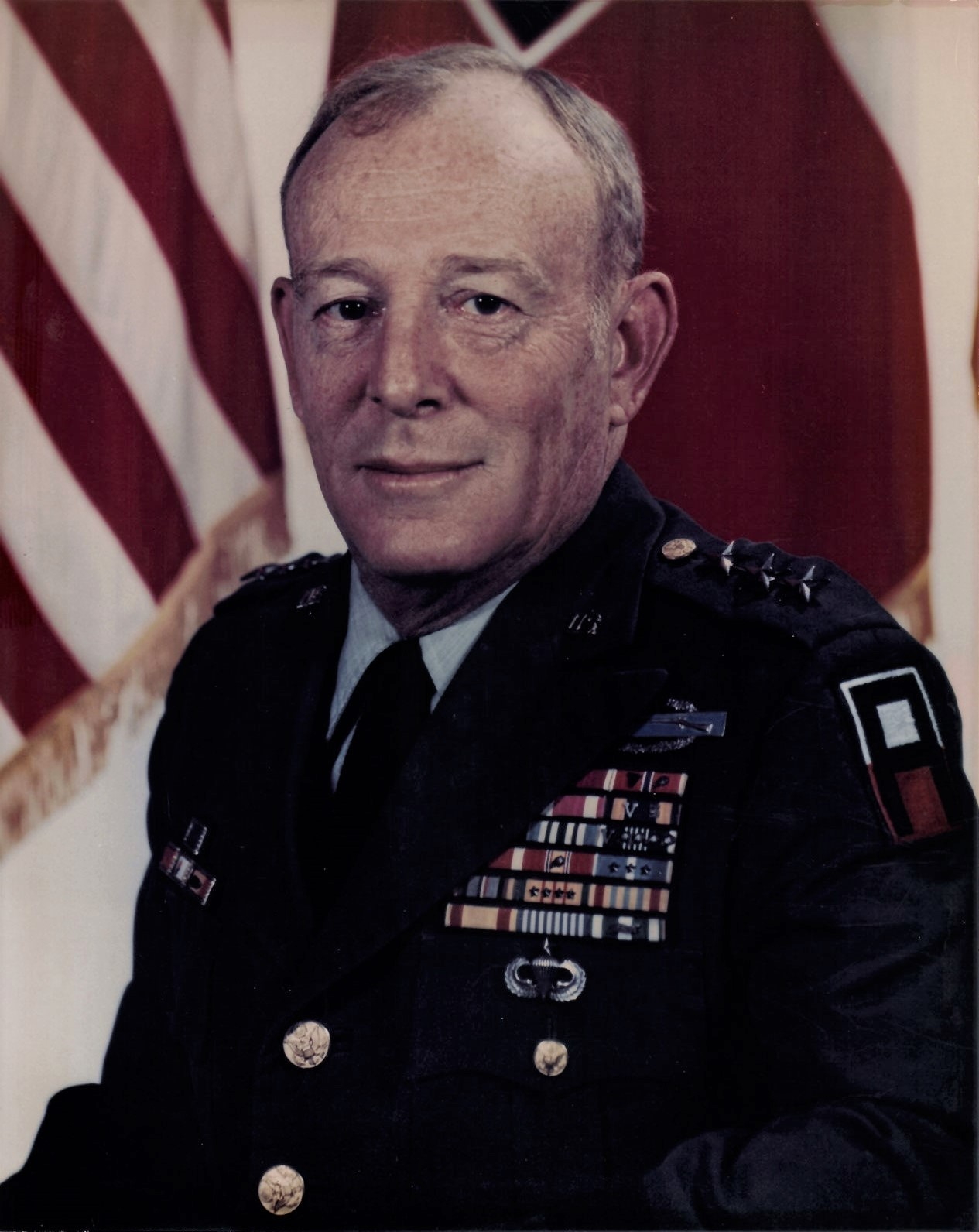
- Born: June 3, 1929; The Bronx, New York, United States
- Died: September 6, 2022 (aged 93); Savannah, Georgia, United States
- Military career
- Allegiance: United States
- Branch: United States Army
- Service years: 1951–1984
- Rank: Lieutenant General
- Commands: First United States Army; 24th Infantry Division; Division Support Command, 101st Airborne Division; 2d Battalion, 327th Parachute Infantry Regiment
- Conflicts: Korean War; Vietnam War
- Awards: Legion of Merit (2); Bronze Star Medal (2)
- Other work: President, Rosenblum and Associates

Donald Edward Rosenblum (June 3, 1929 – September 6, 2022) was a United States Army Lieutenant General. He is an alumnus of The Citadel, Class of 1951.

== Military career ==
As a second lieutenant, Rosenblum served during the Korean War as a Platoon Leader with Company E, 224th Infantry Regiment, a unit of the 40th Infantry Division; one of his fellow platoon leaders in Company E was Edward C. Meyer.

In the early 1960s, Rosenblum was assigned to the Special Warfare Office of the Army's Office of the Chief of Research and Development. In 1963 he graduated from the United States Army Command and General Staff College. He was executive secretary of the Army Scientific Advisory Panel from 1965 to 1966 as a major.

Rosenblum commanded a battalion of the 101st Airborne Division in Vietnam during the Vietnam War. He graduated from the United States Army War College in 1969. In his second Vietnam tour, he was commander of the Division Support Command (DISCOM) for the 101st.

As a major general, Rosenblum commanded the 24th Infantry Division from 1975 to 1977; he also served as Deputy Chief of Staff for Training at the United States Army Training and Doctrine Command as well as Deputy Commanding General of the XVIII Airborne Corps.

As a lieutenant general, Rosenblum was Commanding General of the First United States Army from 1981 until being succeeded by Charles D. Franklin in 1984. He retired to Savannah, Georgia, where he started a consulting firm, Rosenblum and associates. In 1990, he was awarded an honorary Doctor of Military Science degree from The Citadel. He died on September 6, 2022.

== Awards and decorations ==
Combat Infantryman Badge (two awards)
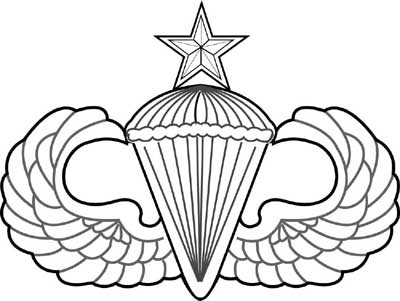
Senior Parachutist Badge
Joint Chiefs of Staff Identification Badge
Army Staff Identification Badge

Legion of Merit with one bronze oak leaf cluster
Bronze Star Medal with "V" device and oak leaf cluster
Meritorious Service Medal
Air Medal with V device and bronze award numeral 5
Joint Service Commendation Medal
Army Commendation Medal with V device and four oak leaf clusters
Army Presidential Unit Citation
Meritorious Unit Commendation
Army of Occupation Medal
National Defense Service Medal with oak leaf cluster
Korean Service Medal with three bronze service stars
Armed Forces Expeditionary Medal
Vietnam Service Medal with eight service stars
Vietnam Armed Forces Honor Medal, 1st class
Vietnam Armed Forces Honor Medal, 2nd class
Republic of Korea Presidential Unit Citation
Vietnam Gallantry Cross Unit Citation
United Nations Korea Medal
Vietnam Campaign Medal
