= James G. Kalergis =

U.S. Army soldier (1917–1991)

- Born: January 13, 1917; Lowell, Massachusetts
- Died: April 13, 1991 (aged 74); Washington, D.C.
- Military career
- Allegiance: United States
- Branch: United States Army
- Service years: 1941–1975
- Rank: Lieutenant General
- Commands: First United States Army; 2nd Armored Division; I Corps Field Artillery; 597th Armored Field Artillery Battalion
- Conflicts: World War II; Vietnam War
- Awards: Army Distinguished Service Medal (2); Legion of Merit (2); Bronze Star Medal

James George Kalergis (January 13, 1917 – April 13, 1991) was a United States Army lieutenant general. His career spanned the World War II and post-Vietnam eras, and he played a significant role in the post-Vietnam-era reorganization of the Army.

== Early life and education ==
Kalergis was born in Lowell, Massachusetts, on January 13, 1917. His father, George Demetrios Kalergis, and his mother, Nicoletta Vasilakos Kalergis, were immigrants from Greece.

Kalergis graduated from Boston University. His education continued during his military career when he earned a master's degree in international relations at George Washington University and attended the six-week Advanced Management Program at Harvard Business School. He also attended United States Army officer training at the Command and General Staff School at Fort Leavenworth, Kansas and the United States Army War College.

== Career ==
=== Military service ===
Kalergis enlisted in the United States Army in February 1941, prior to the entrance of the United States into World War II. He was commissioned as a lieutenant after attending the Field Artillery Officer Candidate School at Fort Sill, Oklahoma in 1942. He served as an artillery officer with the 882nd Field Artillery Battalion. By November 1943, he was a captain and battalion adjutant and promoted to major shortly after the unit arrived in France in February 1945. He was awarded the Bronze Star Medal while with the 882nd, which generally supported the 70th Infantry Division's 274th Infantry Regiment during the Rhineland and Central Europe campaigns.

From 1949 to 1952, Kalergis, as a major, was an assistant professor of military science and tactics at Saint Bonaventure College, a Franciscan school in St. Bonaventure, New York. As a lieutenant colonel in 1954, Kalergis commanded the 36th Field Artillery Group's 597th Armored Field Artillery Battalion in Hanau, Germany.

In the 1960s, Kalergis served tours in South Korea and as commander of the 2nd Armored Division at Fort Hood, Texas. During the Vietnam War from 1967 to 1968, he commanded the artillery for the corps-level organization I Field Force, Vietnam. The next year, he served as First Field Force's chief of staff. In Vietnam, he was recognized in efforts to quantify and reduce "harassment and interdiction fire", artillery fire intended to reduce enemy morale and movement. Yet in practice, it was rarely observed or checked for results and generally proved useless in countering enemy activities in a war without fronts. Kalergis developed systems to quantify and significantly reduce its use due to ineffectiveness, collateral damage to civilians and its high cost.

As a major general, Kalergis was Deputy Commanding General for Logistical Support of the United States Army Materiel Command from 1970 to 1972. In early 1972, Kalergis was recognized for his organizational abilities and tasked with drawing up the 1973 reorganization of the United States Army, the most extensive reorganization of the army in the continental United States since 1942. Operation Steadfast resulted in the establishment of United States Army Forces Command (FORSCOM) and United States Army Training and Doctrine Command (TRADOC). It was followed by subsequent reorganizations in Army Staff Headquarters and of units in the field. The effort to accomplish internal reorganization was initiated with the Army, forestalling efforts by the executive or legislative branch in the post-Vietnam era. Kalergis then served as assistant vice chief for Army Chief of Staff.

In 1974 Kalergis succeeded Glenn D. Walker as commanding general of the First United States Army at Fort Meade, Maryland. He served in this post until his 1975 retirement.

=== Post-military service ===
After retiring from the military, in 1976 Kalerigis chaired a task force that drafted an action plan Tank Weapon System Management. A Program for Maximum Effectiveness to improve armored forces management. He served as a Pentagon consultant from 1979 to 1982. He was also chairman of Vinnell Corporation which trained the Saudi National Guard.

== Personal life ==
Kalerigis died of cancer at Walter Reed Army Medical Center on April 13, 1991, at the age of 74. He resided in Alexandria, Virginia and was married to Norma Butler (1919–1996) for 50 years at the time of his death.

General and Norma Kalergis are buried at Arlington National Cemetery, Section 7A, Grave 61.
