= Vernon McGarity =

United States Army Medal of Honor recipient

- Born: December 1, 1921; Hardin County, Tennessee
- Died: May 21, 2013 (aged 91); Bartlett, Tennessee
- Burial place: Memorial Park Cemetery, Memphis, Tennessee
- Military career
- Allegiance: United States of America
- Branch: United States Army; Tennessee Army National Guard
- Service years: 1942 – 1947 (Army); 1947 – 1974 (National Guard)
- Rank: Lieutenant Colonel
- Units: 3rd Battalion, 393rd Infantry Regiment, 99th Infantry Division
- Conflicts: World War II • Battle of the Bulge
- Awards: Medal of Honor
- Other work: Veterans Administration

Thomas Vernon McGarity II (December 1, 1921 – May 21, 2013) was a United States Army soldier and a recipient of the United States Military's highest decoration, the Medal of Honor, for his actions during the Battle of the Bulge in World War II.

== Biography ==
Born in Hardin County, Tennessee on December 1, 1921, McGarity joined the army in November 1942.

By December 16, 1944, the first day of the Battle of the Bulge, he was serving near Krinkelt, Belgium as a technical sergeant in Company L of the 393rd Infantry Regiment, 99th Infantry Division. Wounded early in the battle, McGarity returned to his unit, and as squad leader, directed and encouraged his soldiers throughout the intense fight that ensued. He repeatedly braved heavy fire to rescue wounded men, attacked the advancing Germans, and retrieved supplies. Medics attempted to have McGarity evacuated after he was severely wounded on his face and legs, but he refused. After completely running out of ammunition, his squad and he were captured. For his actions during the battle, he was presented with the Medal of Honor a year later, on January 11, 1946, by President Harry S Truman. He left active service in 1947 to join the Tennessee Army National Guard, retiring as a Lieutenant Colonel in 1974.

McGarity died at the age of 91 in 2013.

== Medal of Honor citation ==
His official citation reads:

He was painfully wounded in an artillery barrage that preceded the powerful counteroffensive launched by the Germans near Krinkelt, Belgium, on the morning of 16 December 1944. He made his way to an aid station, received treatment, and then refused to be evacuated, choosing to return to his hard-pressed men, instead. The fury of the enemy's great Western Front offensive swirled about the position held by T/Sgt. McGarity's small force, but so tenaciously did these men fight on orders to stand firm at all costs that they could not be dislodged despite murderous enemy fire and the breakdown of their communications. During the day, the heroic squad leader rescued one of his friends, who had been wounded in a forward position, and throughout the night, he exhorted his comrades to repulse the enemy's attempts at infiltration. When morning came and the Germans attacked with tanks and infantry, he braved heavy fire to run to an advantageous position where he immobilized the enemy's lead tank with a round from a rocket launcher. Fire from his squad drove the attacking infantrymen back, and three supporting tanks withdrew. He rescued, under heavy fire, another wounded American, and then directed devastating fire on a light cannon, which had been brought up by the hostile troops to clear resistance from the area. When ammunition began to run low, T/Sgt. McGarity, remembering an old ammunition hole about 100 yards distant in the general direction of the enemy, braved a concentration of hostile fire to replenish his unit's supply. By a circuitous route, the enemy managed to emplace a machinegun to the rear and flank of the squad's position, cutting off the only escape route. Unhesitatingly, the gallant soldier took it upon himself to destroy this menace single-handedly. He left cover, and while under steady fire from the enemy, killed or wounded all the hostile gunners with deadly accurate rifle fire and prevented all attempts to reman the gun. Only when the squad's last round had been fired was the enemy able to advance and capture the intrepid leader and his men. The extraordinary bravery and extreme devotion to duty of T/Sgt. McGarity supported a remarkable delaying action which provided the time necessary for assembling reserves and forming a line against which the German striking power was shattered.

== Awards and decorations ==

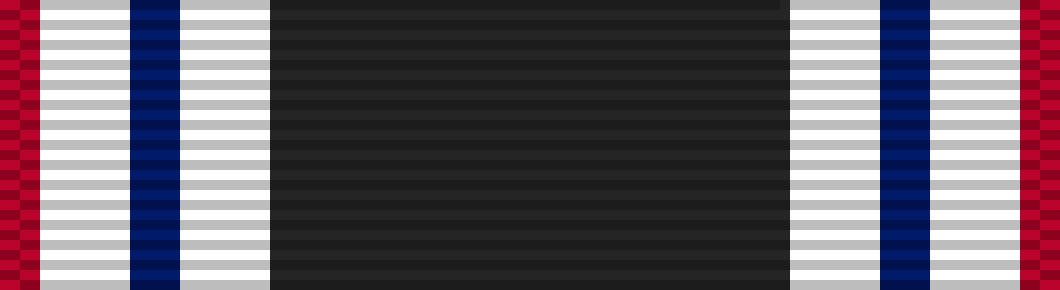

Badge	Combat Infantryman Badge		
1st row	Medal of Honor		
2nd row	Bronze Star Medal	Purple Heart	Prisoner of War Medal
3rd row	Army Good Conduct Medal	American Campaign Medal	European–African–Middle Eastern Campaign Medal with 2 Campaign stars
4th row	World War II Victory Medal	National Defense Service Medal with 1 Oak leaf cluster	Armed Forces Reserve Medal

== See also ==
- List of Medal of Honor recipients
