= Glenn Walker (footballer, born 1967) =

English footballer

Personal information
- Full name: Glenn Philip Walker
- Date of birth: 15 March 1967 (age 59)
- Place of birth: Warrington, England
- Position: Midfielder

Senior career*
Years	Team	Apps	(Gls)
1984–1985	Burnley	0	(0)
1985	Crewe Alexandra	2	(0)
- * Club domestic league appearances and goals

Glenn Philip Walker (born 15 March 1967) is an English former professional footballer who played as a midfielder. He made two appearances in the Football League.
