= Glenn D. Walker =

United States Army general

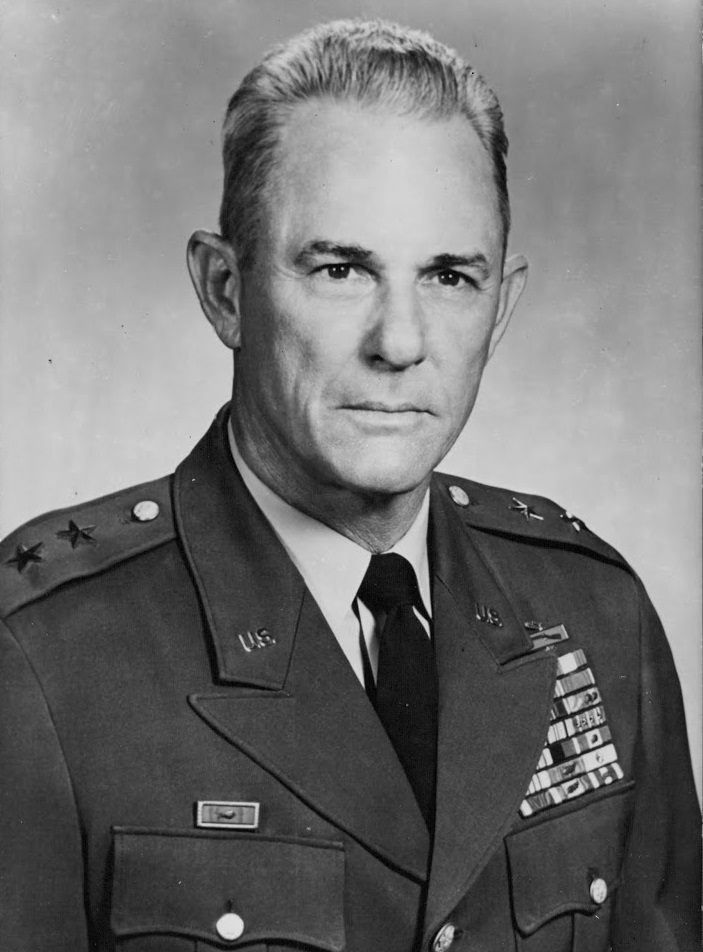
- Major General Glenn Walker, 1970
- Born: January 21, 1916; Hineston, Louisiana, US
- Died: May 3, 2002 (aged 86); Kosciusko, Mississippi, US
- Burial place: Memorial Park, Union, Mississippi
- Spouse: Margaret Hays Walker (m. 1941–2002 (his death))
- Military career
- Allegiance: United States
- Branch: United States Army
- Service years: 1934–1974; 1976–1979
- Rank: Lieutenant General
- Service number: 0-33282
- Commands: Mississippi National Guard; First United States Army; I Corps; 4th Infantry Division; 3rd Brigade Task Force (Vietnam); 6th Infantry Regiment
- Conflicts: World War II; Vietnam War
- Awards: Army Distinguished Service Medal (2); Silver Star (2); Legion of Merit; Distinguished Flying Cross; Bronze Star Medal; Purple Heart; Air Medal

Glenn D. Walker (January 21, 1916 – May 3, 2002) was a lieutenant general in the United States Army. He was notable as commander of the 4th Infantry Division, First United States Army, I Corps, and adjutant general of the Mississippi National Guard.

== Early life ==
Glenn David Walker was born in Hineston, Louisiana, on January 21, 1916. His family moved to Morton, Mississippi in 1926, and Walker graduated from Morton High School in 1934.

After high school, Walker attended East Central Junior College, and enlisted in the Mississippi Army National Guard. He subsequently attended the University of Mississippi and Mississippi College, graduating from Mississippi College in 1939. After graduating, he remained at Mississippi College as an instructor and athletic coach.

== Military career ==
=== World War II ===
In 1941, Walker received his commission as a second lieutenant of Infantry. He was promoted to first lieutenant in 1942, captain in 1943, major in July 1944, and lieutenant colonel in August 1944.

Walker entered active duty for World War II in 1942 as a member of the 22nd Infantry Regiment, a unit of the 4th Infantry Division. He received a commission, completed training with his unit in the United States and England, and commanded a company. He took part in the Utah Beach assault during the Normandy landings as executive officer of the regiment's 3rd Battalion.

By the time of Operation Cobra, Walker was in command of a battalion, and he continued to lead his unit until he was wounded during the Battle of Hürtgen Forest. Walker remained hospitalized until June 1945.

=== Post-World War II ===
After the war, Walker remained in the army and served as an Infantry School instructor at Fort Benning, Georgia. He then served with the Army Advisory Group in Nanjing, and on the staff of the Far East Command in Tokyo.

Walker graduated from the United States Army Command and General Staff College in 1951, and after graduation remained at the school as a faculty member for three years. He was promoted to colonel and graduated from the United States Army War College in 1955. Walker then served in West Germany, first as deputy chief of staff for intelligence (G-2) at Seventh United States Army and then as commander of the 6th Infantry Regiment.

Walker was assigned to the Pentagon in 1958, first on the staff of the Army's deputy chief of staff for operations (G-3), and then on the staff of the Joint Chiefs of Staff. In July 1963, Walker graduated from the National War College, after which he carried out assignments as deputy chief of staff for personnel (G-1), first with Eighth United States Army in South Korea, and then with United States Army Pacific in Hawaii.

=== Vietnam War ===
In 1965, Walker was promoted to brigadier general and assigned as assistant division commander of the 4th Infantry Division, and deployed with the division to South Vietnam. From April to October 1966 he commanded the 3rd Brigade Task Force, which was subsequently organized as 3rd Brigade, 25th Infantry Division.

In October 1966, Walker returned to the 4th Infantry Division as assistant division commander, and he continued to serve in Vietnam until August 1967.

After returning to the United States, Walker was assigned to the Continental Army Command as deputy chief of staff for military operations and reserve forces. He was promoted to major general in November 1967.

In November 1969, Walker returned to Vietnam, this time as commander of the 4th Infantry Division. He led the Division until June 1970, when he was relieved by Major General William A. Burke.

=== Senior commands ===
Walker returned to the Pentagon in 1970 as assistant deputy chief of staff for military operations in the office of the Army's deputy chief of staff for operations (G-3). In July 1971, Walker was appointed commander of I Corps in South Korea and promoted to lieutenant general. In August, 1972 he returned to the United States as a special assistant for training in the office of the Army Chief of Staff.

Walker was assigned as commander of First United States Army at Fort Meade, Maryland in August 1973. He served until August 1974, when he retired from the army.

=== Mississippi Adjutant General ===
From 1974 to 1976, Walker lived in retirement on a farm in Union, Mississippi. In February 1976, he returned to military service when he was appointed adjutant general of the Mississippi National Guard. He served in this post until retiring again in 1980.

== Awards and decorations ==
Walker's awards and decorations included (partial list):

- Army Distinguished Service Medal (2)
- Silver Star (2)
- Legion of Merit
- Distinguished Flying Cross
- Bronze Star Medal
- Purple Heart
- Air Medal

== Personal life ==
In 1941, Walker married Margaret Hays Walker (1916–2007). Their children included: Glenn D. Walker, Jr. (Dave); Dr. Michael Walker; and Keith C. Walker. Glenn D. Walker, Jr. served in the army and retired as a lieutenant colonel. Michael Walker became a veterinarian. Keith Walker served in the army, and retired as a lieutenant general.

Walker died in Kosciusko, Mississippi on May 3, 2002. He was buried at Memorial Park in Union.

Military offices
Preceded by Donn R. Pepke	Commander of the 4th Infantry Division; 1969–1970	Succeeded by William A. Burke
Preceded by Edward L. Rowny	Commander of I Corps; 1971–1972	Succeeded by Richard T. Knowles
Preceded by Claire E. Hutchin, Jr.	Commander of First United States Army; 1973–1974	Succeeded by James G. Kalergis
Preceded by E. A. (Bebe) Turnage	Adjutant General of the Mississippi National Guard; 1976–1980	Succeeded by Cohen E. Robertson
