= 393rd Infantry Regiment =

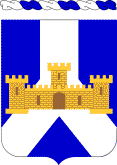
- Coat of arms of the 393rd Infantry Regiment
- Active: Constituted 23 July 1918, assigned to 99th Infantry Division (United States); Demobilized 30 November 1918; Reconstituted 24 June 1921, assigned to 99th Infantry Division; Organized November, 1921; Activated 15 November 1942; Inactivated 20 September 1945; Redesignated 9 July 1952, Army Reserve; Relieved 29 October 1998, from assignment to 99th Infantry Division; Redesignated 17 October 1999, as 393rd Regiment, assigned to 75th Division (Training Support)
- Country: United States of America
- Allegiance: United States Army
- Branch: United States Army Reserve
- Engagements: World War II: Rhineland; Ardennes-Alsace; Central Europe
- Battle honours: Belgian Fourragere, World War II

Commanders
- Notable commanders: James K. Woolnough

Insignia
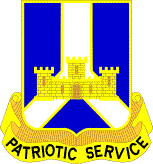
- Distinctive Unit Insignia

The 393d Infantry Regiment is a U.S. Army Reserve regiment that is assigned to 75th Infantry Division (Training Support).

== Coat of arms ==
=== Blazon ===
- Shield: Azure, over a pairle reversed Argent a castle Or.
- Crest: That for the regiments and separate battalions of the Army Reserve: From a wreath Argent and Azure, the Lexington Minute Man Proper. The statue of the Minute Man, stands on the common in Lexington, Massachusetts. (Image of crest is not shown on this page)

=== Symbolism ===
- Shield: The shield is blue for Infantry. The pairle reversed represents the Allegheny and Mononaghela Rivers going to form the Ohio River at Pittsburgh, the location of the original unit. The castle is taken from the crest of the city coat of arms.
- Crest: The crest is that of the U.S. Army Reserves. (Image of crest is not shown on this page)

== Lineage ==
The regiment was constituted on 23 July 1918 in the National Army as the 393rd Infantry and assigned to the 99th Division. It demobilized on 30 November 1918. On 24 June 1921, the regiment was reconstituted in the Organized Reserves (which later became the U.S. Army Reserve) and was again assigned to the 99th Division (which later became the 99th Infantry Division), with its headquarters at Pittsburgh, Pennsylvania.

On 15 November 1942 the regiment was mobilized and sent to Camp Van Dorn, Mississippi. After subsequent training at Camp Maxey, Texas, the regiment was shipped to the European Theater of Operations. Following the end of World War II, the regiment returned to the United States and was inactivated 20 September 1945 at Camp Patrick Henry, Virginia, returning to its previous status as a reserve unit.

On 29 October 1998 the regiment was relieved from assignment to the 99th Infantry Division and on 17 October 1999 as the 393rd Regiment was assigned to the 75th Division (Training Support).
